= ENAC Alumni =

Alumni association in Toulouse, France

- Motto: Association des diplômés de l'École Nationale de l'Aviation Civile
- Motto in English: Alumni association of the French Civil Aviation University
- Type: Nonprofit
- Established: 1987
- President: Marc Houalla
- Location: Toulouse, Midi-Pyrénées, France
- Colours: Blue and Grey
- Website: alumni.enac.fr

ENAC Alumni is a nonprofit organization, alumni association created in 1987, and registered in Toulouse, Midi-Pyrénées. A key founder and former vice president of the association was Robert Aladenyse who dedicated his career to the ENAC alumni. Each year, the Robert Aladenyse Award recognizes the best internships of the year.

== History ==
The École Nationale de l'Aviation Civile was founded in 1949 in Orly, France. Its initial purpose was to educate the future public workers of the Directorate General for Civil Aviation. At the beginning of the 1970s, the university started the recruitment of students for the aerospace industry, outside of its original pool of future DGAC employees. The number of so-called "civilian" students steadily grew in the 1980s. Robert Aladenyse (1931-2003, 1964 graduate) decided in 1987 to create a nonprofit organization for the aviation engineers (Diplôme d'ingénieur) alumni. This association was then called IngENAC.

In the 2000s, the development of the Master's degree and Mastères Spécialisés programs led IngENAC to expand its membership to these new alumnus. On January 1, 2010, ENAC merged with the SEFA (flight school) and became the largest aeronautical university in Europe. These major changes in the profile of ENAC and its alumni population were an impetus for a deeper redevelopment of IngENAC into a broader alumni association reflecting the new ambitions of the university and the diversity of its community. In 2012, IngENAC changed name and became known as ENAC Alumni. The newly rebranded association is now the alumni association of all graduates of ENAC, whatever their degree. This includes the Aeronautical operations technicians, the Techniciens supérieur de l'aviation, the Air Traffic Safety Electronics Personnels and the Ingénieurs des études et de l'exploitation de l'aviation civile. The new status became effective in March 2012.

In February 2019, ENAC Alumni held the first edition of The State of the Air (Les Etats de l'Air) which is a conference featuring a series of round tables and master classes with a panel of aviation leaders. The 2019 edition was hosted by the French DGAC. This event is now held annually in Paris. The first African edition was organized in 2024 in Cameroon and the association is working on a second edition in 2026.

=== ENAC Alumni USA ===
The U.S. chapter of ENAC Alumni was founded in December 2018. It has over 100 members across the United States. Its programs include developing the membership, mentoring students and young professionals, promoting diversity and inclusion, and strengthening the relationship with U.S. universities. It has ongoing task forces on the U.S. licenses & certifications and professional organizations. The chapter has also an emergency information and mutual aid coordination initiative that was launched in response to Hurricane Dorian and was activated again during the COVID-19 crisis.

=== Airport Think Tank ===
The Airport Think Tank is chaired by Gaël Le Bris. With over 100 members. This think tank is conducting The Future of Airports: A Vision of 2040 and 2070, a research initiative on the long-term future of the airport industry. This project involves a global industry panel of about 20 thought aviation leaders worldwide as well as regional task forces. The first version of the global analysis was released in April 2020.

== Industrial and institutional partners ==
According to the website of ENAC Alumni, the key partners of the association are the following:

- Airbus Group
- Airexpo
- Akka Technologies
- Conférence des grandes écoles
- Elles Bougent
- ENAC
- ENVOL JE
- France Aviation Civile Services
- Ingénieurs et scientifiques de France
- Luxair
- TBS Alumni

Also, ENAC Alumni supports various student initiatives such as the annual air show Airexpo organized jointly with the Institut Supérieur de l'Aéronautique et de l'Espace community. The association is a partner of the Aeronautical literary festival.

== Publications and communications ==
ENAC Alumni has published ENAC Alumni Magazine since 2014. This publication is the successor of the Transpondeur of IngENAC.

== In popular culture ==
Yann Gozlan's film, Black Box, released in 2021, includes a scene of a cocktail party organized by ENAC Alumni. For the purposes of the film, real ENAC graduates were extras.

== See also ==
- Direction générale de l'aviation civile
- École nationale de l'aviation civile
