= Jean-Pierre Desthuilliers =

French writer and poet (1939–2013)

- Born: 22 October 1939
- Died: 6 December 2013 (aged 74)
- Occupations: Poet, preface writer, columnist, critic, webmaster,
- Writing career
- Notable awards: Prix Jacques Normand 1987 of the Société des gens de lettres (Society of Men of Letters of France, a writer's association founded in 1838) for Le sculpteur d'eaux

Jean-Pierre Desthuilliers (22 October 1939 – 6 December 2013) was a French writer and poet. He was born on 22 October 1939 in Versailles and died on 6 December 2013.

== Biography ==
Jean-Pierre Desthuilliers went to high school at the collège Albert de Mun, at Michel Bouts' école du Gai Savoir, a school based on the principles of active learning, then at the co-ed lycée of Meaux, now Lycée Henri Moissan. In 1956, he entered a classes préparatoires aux grandes écoles, a two-year preparatory course for enrollment in one of France's "grandes écoles" at Paris' Lycée Henri-IV. Having graduated from ENSICA as an engineer in 1962, he spent twenty years working as an executive in the industrial sector and for a private firm running public services. After that, he became associate manager at Bossard Consultants. There, he contributed to develop social dynamics under Jean-Christian Fauvet's supervision. In 1992, he created a consultancy firm specialised in instructional design and based in Boulogne-Billancourt.

He began to write in 1954, encouraged by the poet Jehan Despert who published some of his work in his Cahiers de l'Île de France and got him a column in the daily newspaper Figaro

Since 1959, he has worked with cultural associations, among which:

- from 1962 to 1974 the youth club (“Maison des Jeunes et de la Culture”), then the cultural center of Chelles where he worked with playwright, singer and actor Michel Heim, among others;
- from 1978 to 1983 the ACILECE, a teachers' bookselling and publishing co-operative that was founded by the writer and poet Maurice Fombeure;
- since 1983, the association La Jointée, which publishes the literary review Jointure, which he founded along with Jacques Arnold, Georges Friedenkraft, Daniel Sauvale and several other poets, and where he held the position of president and treasurer for several years;
- since 2004 the Aire-Falguière theatre which he administrates.

Jean-Pierre Desthuilliers belongs to the Société des poètes français, the French Poets Society.

Besides his professional and literary work, he is involved in various types of political and social action. In particular:

- from 2002 to 2008 he was neighbourhood councillor in the town of Boulogne-Billancourt, where he lives.;
- as a representative of the ENSICA alumni, he played a role in merging the engineering schools SUPAERO and ENSICA, which formed the Institut supérieur de l'aéronautique et de l'espace (ISAE) (Space and Aeronautics Institute) in 2007, and in merging the two alumni associations, into the "Amicale ISAE," which he administrates.

== Works ==
=== Poetry ===
- Published works
  - Le cristal opaque (1974), original drawings by Tardivo, Saint-Germain-des-Prés, collection Miroir oblique. Currently out of print, this book is now published under a Free Art License on the site Culture libre, without illustrations but with an introduction
  - L'arbre parole (1979), drawings by Odile Damon-Leclerc, José Millas-Martin, collection Grand Fond. Currently out of print, this book is now published under a Free Art License on the site Culture libre, without illustrations
  - Le sculpteur d'eaux, (1987), preface by Jacques Arnold, postface by Michel Martin de Villemer, followed by Travaux d'un sculpteur d'eaux, which received the Jacques Normand Award from the Society of Men of Letters of France
  - La vigne adamantine (1999)
  - L'opéra des tarots dorés, partly published in Soif de mots, tome 7, éditions du Brontosaure, January 2000
- Regular and occasional contributions to many literary reviews :
  - Jehan Despert's Les cahiers de l'Île de France
  - La revue de l'ACILECE
  - Jointure
  - Saraswati, edited by Silvaine Arabo
  - Phréatique, edited by poet Gérard Murail
  - Envols, Vermillon, Ottawa, Ontario, Canada – edited by Hédi Bouraoui et Jacques Flamand
  - Les cahiers de l'Alba, edited by Mireille Disdero and Alain Castets
- Publication in anthologies:
  - Poètes de Paris et de l'Île de France, (1957), Paris: éditions de la Revue Moderne
  - Perspectives Spirituelles (1987), Monaco: Regain
  - Jointhologie, invitation au voyage, (1990), Perpignan: La Jointée
  - Eros en Poésie, (2002), Paris: Librairie Galerie Racine, with the participation of the site Ecrits...vains?

=== Prefaces and other paratexts ===
- Preface of Michel Bouts' posthumous novel: Sang Breton, and detailed biography of the author
- Preface of the anthology about birds compiled by Moroccan writer Joseph Ouaknine: Savez-vous parler cui-cui ?
- Postface of Francine Caron's book: Parcs et lunaparks de Paris, 150 haïkus écolo-ludico-bucoliques
- Preface of Christine Guilloux's collection of prose poems: Passages
- Preface of Patricia Laranco's poetry book: Lointitude
- Preface, and index of rare and curious words in Michel Martin de Villemer's book: Morgeline pour ma veuve

=== Essays and articles ===
- Comment lit-on Rimbaud, quand on a dix-sept ans ?, in Les cahiers de l'Alba, number 6-7 special issue about Arthur Rimbaud, second semester 2005, pages 101 to 106
- Triangulation de la perception : le biface et l'os de seiche, in Plastir no. 15, June 2009

=== Publishing and poetic action ===
- Directs the literary collection Les oeuvres jointes
- Creates and runs writing workshops and poetic performances
- Co-produced the CD-rom Henri Landier ou la cohérence d'une oeuvre along with philosopher Bruno Picot
