= École nationale supérieure d'ingénieurs de constructions aéronautiques =

French engineering school in Toulouse

ENSICA
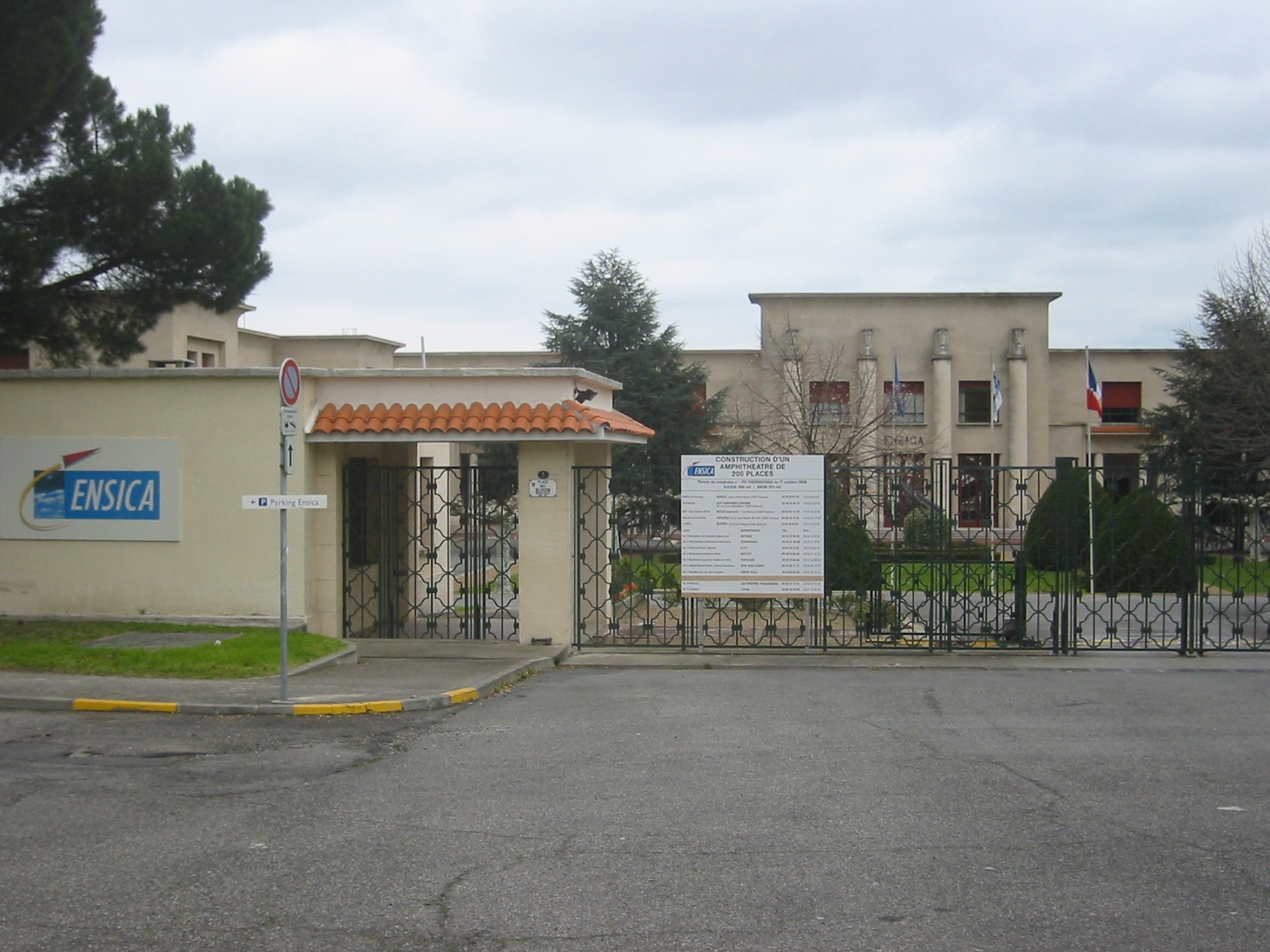
- Type: Grande école
- Active: 1945–2007
- Affiliations: French Ministry of Defense, GEA
- Administrative staff: 30 (permanent professors) + 770 (invited speakers)
- Students: about 500
- Location: Toulouse, Haute-Garonne, France
- Campus: Urban
- Mascot: Toucan
- Website: www.isae.fr

The École nationale supérieure d'ingénieurs de constructions aéronautiques (French pronunciation: [ekɔl nɑsjɔnal sypeʁjœʁ dɛ̃ʒenjœʁ də kɔ̃stʁyksjɔ̃ aeʁɔnotik]; meaning "National Higher School of aeronautical constructions"), or ENSICA, was a French engineering school founded in 1945. It was located in Toulouse. In 2007, Ensica merged with Supaéro to form the Institut supérieur de l'aéronautique et de l'espace (ISAE-SUPAERO).

Ensica recruited its students from the French "Concours des Grandes Écoles", a competitive examination which requires studies at the "classes préparatoires". Classes préparatoires last two years where students are to work intensively on mathematics and physics. Studies at Ensica lasted for 3 years where students eventually got a Master in Aeronautics.

Area of studies cover all the fundamentals of aeronautics, including: aerodynamics, structures, fluid dynamics, thermal power, electronics, control theory, airframe systems, IT, etc. Students are also trained in management, manufacturing, certification, and foreign languages.

Main employers are Airbus, Thales, Dassault, Safran (Sagem, Snecma), Rolls-Royce, Astrium, Eurocopter.

== History ==
The decree giving birth to the "Ecole Nationale des Travaux Aéronautiques" (ENTA) was signed in 1945. The text was then ratified by Charles de Gaulle, president of the temporary government, and by René Pleven, Finance Minister. There were 25 students in the first class and 24 of them joined the "Ingénieurs Militaires des Travaux de l'Air" (IMTA).

In 1957, the school changed its name to the "Ecole Nationale d'Ingénieurs des Constructions Aéronautiques" (ENICA).The course was extended to three years and the school embarked on its new civil vocation welcoming a higher proportion of civil students.

In 1961, ENICA was transferred to Toulouse, the director at that time being Emile Blouin. It then took on a new dimension and established its identity. In 1969, the school joined the competitive entrance examination system organised by the Ecoles Nationales Supérieures d'Ingénieurs (ENSI). It thus increased its recruitment standards to become one of the leading French schools. This excellence was rewarded in 1979 when it received the Médaille de l'Aéronautique from Général Georges Bousquet: ENICA then became ENSICA, Ecole Nationale Supérieure d'Ingénieurs de Constructions Aéronautiques.

The eighties were marked by a profound diversification in the training courses offered: opening of a "Mastère" degree and an Advanced Studies degree (DEA) in automatic control and mechanics, specialisations in aircraft maintenance and helicopter techniques. ENSICA became the top-listed school for students with pass marks in ENSI competitive entrance examinations and continuously increased the part set aside for research. It also internationalised its training by implementing exchange programmes with English, American and German institutes and universities. In 1994, ENSICA became a public establishment and can now sign, in its own name, agreements and conventions with other organisations and receive research contracts.

Today, ENSICA has a staff of 150 people including 25 scientific directors and almost 700 part-time lecturers. The school can accommodate more than 400 students on the initial training courses and the same number of persons doing further training. The 50th class recently graduated. It included a total of 98 graduates 11 students of which did their third year of studies in a foreign university (USA, Great Britain, Germany and Sweden) and a high number of students who carried out their end of study projects abroad.

== Missions ==
A public establishment under the auspices of the Ministry of Defence, ENSICA gives technological teaching courses for civil and military engineering students and offers a range of training:

- "Diplôme d'Ingenieur" (engineer's diploma) course;
- training for and through scientific research;
- a set of "Mastère Spécialisé" courses;
- further education courses;
- research.

The engineer's course lasts three years.

== Departments of Ensica ==
At ENSICA, research and training are integrated into the four training and research departments: avionics and systems, mechanical engineering, fluid mechanics, applied mathematics and computer science.

All the departments are composed with a scientific staff. The staff is composed by lecturers-researchers with Ph.D's, lecturers and senior lecturers from universities and full professors. They are responsible for the research work and pedagogical engineering, as well as the coordination of the lecturers' teams. By this way, they actively participate in international actions and in industrial relations.

The lecturers come, for one third, from the university and research world, for one fourth from industry and one fourth from the DGA.

Human, economics, social, linguistics and multi-cultural training is under the responsibility of three departments: human and social sciences, sports and languages.

Main departments are Avionics, Mechanical Engineering, Fluid Dynamics and Mathematics

== Avionics ==
The Avionics & Systems Department develop : - In the first year a basic training in: Signal processing, Automatic System and Electrical Engineering.

- In the third year, two advanced itineraries are proposed into the field :

- Signals - Communications
- Control - Avionics

The Department trains at these multidisciplinary itineraries :

- Aircraft system
- Space systems
- Control - Guidance
- Radar - Telecommunications

Preparation for the post-graduate diplomas DEA (Advanced Studies Diploma) :

- Signals - images - acoustics
- automatics systems.

These two itineraries allow, respectively, the preparation for the postgraduate diplomas signals-images-acoutics and automatic systems.

=== Taught subjects ===
- Functional approach of electronics and electric engineering
- Strong theorical bases of signal processing allowing a use in image processing, radar and telecommunications.
- Optics and optronics bases.
- Antennas and radars theories and applications in the aeronautical and spatial domains.
- Approach of real-time systems based on a concrete system built on a micro controller.
- Finally, control : from modelisation and control of simple processes to applied advanced methods in the aeronautical domain.

== Mechanical engineering ==
The aim of the Mechanical engineering Department's curriculum is to provide the students with basic knowledge in mechanics indispensable for their future jobs as engineers and this within a multidisciplinary aerospace training framework.

The Mechanical Engineering courses lasts three years and includes : - basic training including fundamental knowledge mainly concerning calculation of structures and technological knowledge of mechanisms, manufacturing and materials, - training applied to aeronautics and space; this part increasing progressively throughout the three years.

This common core is complemented, within the scope the third-year optional modules, by courses given at ENSICA for the Mechanical Engineering advanced studies degree and more specialised courses related to aeronautics and space.

The Mechanical Engineering Department also coordinates the school's space activities: this specific space training corresponds to around 250 hours and development is oriented both towards ultralight systems and crewed flight engineering.

== Fluid Dynamics ==
The courses given by the Fluid Mechanics Department concern the thermodynamics of irreversible processes and continuum mechanics. The courses in these two disciplines are given in the first year and are completed by a basic fluid mechanics course (general equations of the movement of a Newtonian fluid and inviscid fluid movements). In the second year, the studies concern the flow of incompressible viscous fluids and compressible inviscid fluids dealing with the boundary layer, shock wave and turbulence phenomena with complements in unsteady fluid hypersonic and mechanical phenomena.

From these theoretical bases, aeronautical applications are introduced in the second year. They mainly concern:

external aerodynamics plus flight mechanics and handling qualities. aeronautical turbine engines.

== Mathematics ==
The goals of CS training are:

(1) to study the methods for developing programs (specification methods, object-oriented design, structured programming algorithms, testing);

(2) to learn the basics of algorithmics

(3) in-depth study of object programming, and learning an object-oriented methodology that uses UML as modeling notation;

(4) to study the specific features of "Real-Time" applications and systems and of new-generation network architectures in close association with the research work carried out in the department. Practical implementations of theoretical concepts are based on Java language;

ENSICA is co-accredited for issuing the Toulouse Systems Postgraduate School's Computer-based Systems DEAs (Advanced Studies Degrees) in cooperation with UPS science university, INSA and SUPAERO engineering schools, and the Toulouse CS and Telecommunications Postgraduate School's Networks and Telecommunications DEAs in cooperation with INPT engineering school, UPS science university, SUPAERO, INSA, ENST and ENAC engineering schools.

== Training periods and international perspectives ==
During the 3 years, students of Ensica have the opportunity of studying for one semester or one year abroad, or make a one-year additional training period in a company.

Foreign partnerships include:

Australia

- University of Technology Sydney

Belgium

- Vrije Universiteit Brussel
- Katholieke Universiteit Leuven
- Université catholique de Louvain

Canada

- Université de Sherbrooke
- Ecole Polytechnique de Montréal

China

- Nanjing University

Germany

- Technical University of Munich
- University of Stuttgart
- RWTH Aachen University
- Technische Universität Braunschweig

Italy

- Politecnico di Torino
- Politecnico di Milano

Mexico

- Instituto Politécnico Nacional

Netherlands

- Delft University of Technology

Poland

- Warsaw University of Technology
- Lublin University of Technology

Romania

- Polytechnic University of Bucharest
- Military Technical Academy

Russia

- Samara State Aerospace University
- St. Petersburg State University

Singapore

- National University of Singapore
- Nanyang Technological University

Spain

- Universidad Politécnica de Madrid (CETSEI)
- Universitat Politècnica de Catalunya (ETSEIB - ETSEIAT)
- Universidad de Sevilla

Sweden

- Kungl Tekniska Högskolan

United Kingdom

- Cranfield University
- Imperial College
- University of Bristol
- University of Southampton
- University of Glasgow

USA

- State University of New York at Buffalo
- Louisiana State University
- University of Wisconsin Madison
- University of Maryland at College Park
- Syracuse University
