= Castelnaudary – Villeneuve Airport =

Castelnaudary - Villeneuve Airport Aérodrome de Castelnaudary - Villeneuve
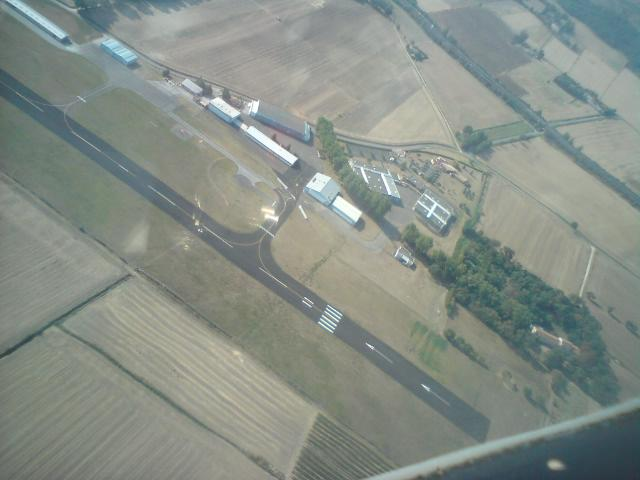
- IATA: none; ICAO: LFMW

Summary
- Airport type: Public
- Serves: Castelnaudary, France
- Location: Villeneuve-la-Comptal, France
- Elevation AMSL: 100 ft / 30 m
- Coordinates: 43°18′40″N 001°55′12″E

Map
- Location of airport in France

Runways
Direction	Length		Surface
Direction	ft	m	Surface
11/29	2,657	810	Asphalt
- Source: French AIP

Castelnaudary – Villeneuve Airport (ICAO code: LFMW) is a civil airport in Villeneuve-la-Comptal, Aude department, 2.5 km south-east of Castelnaudary.

A campus of the École nationale de l'aviation civile (French Civil Aviation University) is located on the aerodrome.
