= Goldnadel =

- Franck Goldnadel (born 1969), former director of Paris-Charles de Gaulle Airport, in France.
- Gilles-William Goldnadel (born 1954), French and Israeli lawyer, author and columnist.
- Jordan Goldnadel (born 1989), French film director, screenwriter, producer and actor.
