= Gérard Rozenknop =

- Born: 23 January 1950 (age 76); 19th arrondissement of Paris
- Citizenship: French
- Education: École Polytechnique; École nationale de l'aviation civile
- Occupations: Advisor to the Director General of Direction Générale de l'Aviation Civile and member of the Académie de l'air et de l'espace
- Employer: Direction Générale de l'Aviation Civile
- Known for: Director-General of the École nationale de l'aviation civile
- Predecessor: Alain Soucheleau
- Successor: Marc Houalla

Gérard Rozenknop (born 23 January 1950 in Paris 19e), is a French public servant. He was director-general of the École nationale de l'aviation civile (French civil aviation university) from 6 January 1999 to 28 November 2008.

== Biography ==
Rozenknop studied at the Lycée Condorcet, before graduating from the École Polytechnique (X 69) and the École nationale de l'aviation civile (IAC 72). He began his career at the air transport department of the Direction générale de l'aviation civile in 1974. In 1977 he worked for ten years at the International Civil Aviation Organization in Montreal and then to Bangkok (Asia-Pacific programs). In 1987 he was appointed Head of the aeronautics department of ENAC and in 1994 director of the direction régionale de l'aviation civile Sud-Est at Aix-en-Provence. On 6 January 1999 he became director of the École nationale de l'aviation civile (French civil aviation university), until 28 November 2008 and the nomination of his successor, Marc Houalla.

== Bibliography ==
- Académie nationale de l'air et de l'espace and Lucien Robineau, Les français du ciel, dictionnaire historique, Le Cherche midi, June 2005, 782 p. (ISBN 2-7491-0415-7)
