= Saint-Yan Airport =

Saint-Yan Airport Aéroport de Saint-Yan
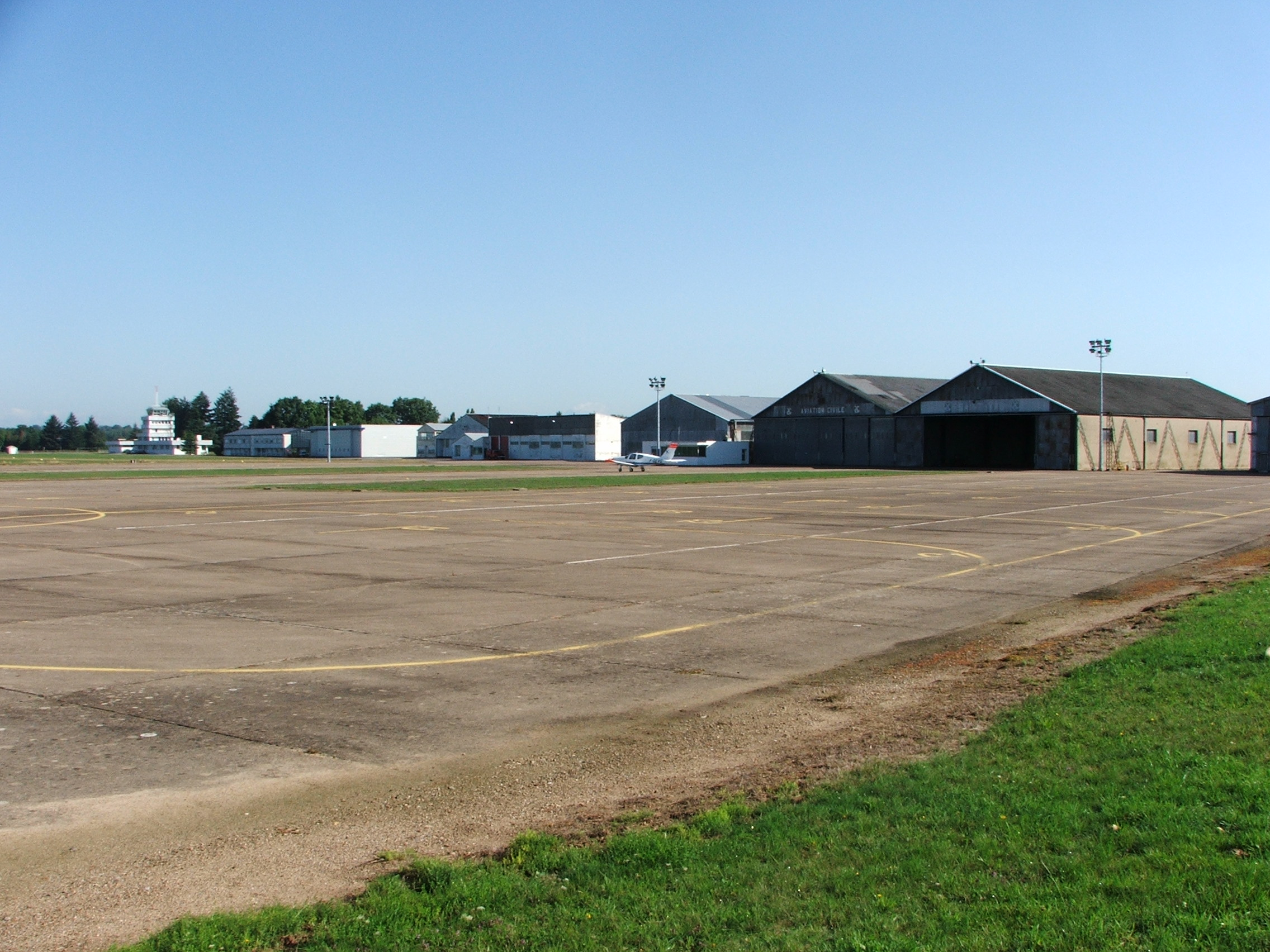
- IATA: SYT; ICAO: LFLN

Summary
- Airport type: Public
- Operator: Saint-Yan Air'e Business (SYAB)
- Serves: Saint-Yan, France
- Elevation AMSL: 796 ft (243 m)
- Coordinates: 46°24′23″N 004°01′16″E
- Website: www.aeroportsaintyan.fr

Map
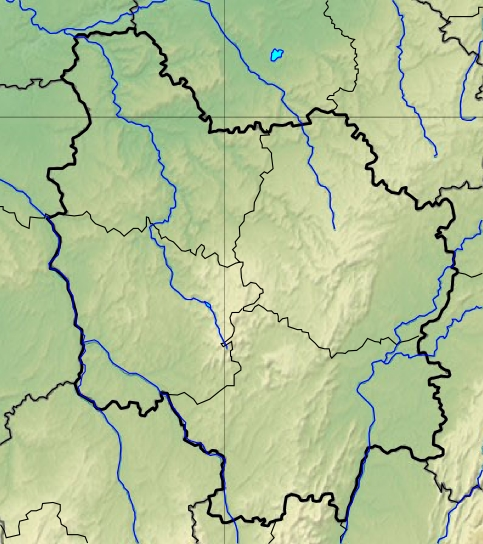
- Location of airfield in Burgundy region Location of Burgundy region in France

Runways
Direction	Length		Surface
Direction	m	ft	Surface
15L/33R	2,030	6,660	Concrete
15R/33L	1,500	4,921	Concrete
15/33	720	2,362	Grass
- Sources: French AIP, UAF, DAFIF

Saint-Yan Airport (French: Aéroport de Saint-Yan, IATA: SYT, ICAO: LFLN), also known as Charolais Bourgogne Sud Airport, is an airport in Saint-Yan, a commune of the Saône-et-Loire department in the Burgundy (Bourgogne) region of France. A campus of the École nationale de l'aviation civile (French civil aviation university) is located on the airport.

== Facilities ==
The airport resides at an elevation of 796 feet (243 m) above mean sea level. It has two concrete paved runways: 15L/33R measuring 2,030 by 45 metres (6,660 ft × 148 ft) and 15R/33L measuring 1,500 by 30 metres (4,921 ft × 98 ft). It also has a parallel grass runway which measures 720 by 100 metres (2,362 ft × 328 ft).
