= Partnership of a European Group of Aeronautics and Space Universities =

Network of aeronautical universities in Europe

Logo of PEGASUS

The Partnership of a European Group of Aeronautics and Space UniversitieS (PEGASUS) is a network of aeronautical universities in Europe created in order to facilitate student exchanges and collaborative research between universities. It has been originally created by the groupement des écoles aéronautiques françaises (group of French aeronautical grandes écoles) (ENAC, ENSMA and ISAE) in 1998.

The European manufacturers like Airbus have close contact with PEGASUS network.

== Member universities ==
The network consists of 30 universities in 12 countries:

- Czech Republic:
  - Czech Technical University in Prague
- France:
  - École de l'air
  - École nationale de l'aviation civile (ENAC)
  - École nationale supérieure de mécanique et d'aérotechnique (ENSMA)
  - Institut Supérieur de l'Aéronautique et de l'Espace (ISAE)
  - École supérieure des techniques aéronautiques et de construction automobile (ESTACA)
- Germany:
  - RWTH Aachen University
  - Technische Universität Berlin
  - Technische Universität Braunschweig
  - Technische Universität Dresden
  - University of Stuttgart
- Italy:
  - Polytechnic University of Milan
  - Polytechnic University of Turin
  - University of Naples Federico II
  - Sapienza University of Rome
  - University of Pisa
  - University of Bologna
- Lithuania:
  - Vilnius Gediminas Technical University (VGTU)
- Netherlands:
  - Delft University of Technology
- Poland:
  - Warsaw University of Technology
- Portugal:
  - Instituto Superior Técnico
- Slovakia:
  - University of Žilina
- Spain:
  - Technical University of Madrid
  - Polytechnic University of Valencia
  - University of Seville
  - School of Industrial and Aeronautic Engineering of Terrassa
- Sweden:
  - Royal Institute of Technology
- United Kingdom:
  - Cranfield University
  - University of Bristol
  - University of Glasgow
