= Olivier Chansou =

- Born: Olivier Chansou; 1965 (age 60–61)
- Education: École nationale de l'aviation civile
- Occupation: Director-General of the École nationale de l'aviation civile
- Employer: Direction Générale de l'Aviation Civile
- Known for: Director-General of the École nationale de l'aviation civile
- Predecessor: Marc Houalla

Olivier Chansou was born on 1965, is a French public servant. Since 27 November 2017, he is the director-general of the École nationale de l'aviation civile (French civil aviation university).

== Biography ==
A graduate from the ENAC (IÉNAC L85) and holder of a Master of Science in IT and parallelism, he began his career at the Directorate General for Civil Aviation as Head of the embedded equipment department at the STNA (Technical Service of Air Navigation) in Paris from 1990 to 1995. He is deputy of the real-time equipment department from 1995 to 1998, then deputy Head of the technical staff office at the DSNA (Directorate of Air Navigation Services) from 1998 to 2002, and finally Head of the systems and methods department at the Directorate of Air Navigation Services from 2002 to 2006.

Head of the Air Traffic Control center of Bordeaux (2006–2009) and staff deputy director of the DGAC (2009–2012), Olivier Chansou manages four departments of the DSNA South-West (Bordeaux) from 2012 to 2017.

The 27 November 2017, he is appointed by the French President Emmanuel Macron CEO of the ENAC, succeeding Marc Houalla.
