= Mohammed VI International Academy of Civil Aviation =

University in Morocco

Coordinates: 33.3809°N 7.5685°W

Académie internationale Mohammed VI de l'aviation civile
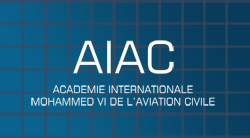
- Other name: AIMAC
- Type: Public aviation university
- Established: 2000
- President: Habiba Laklalech
- Provost: Mohamed El Wafiq
- Students: 180
- Location: Casablanca, Morocco
- Website: www.aiac.ma

The Mohammed VI International Academy of Civil Aviation (Arabic: أكاديمية محمد السادس الدولية للطيران المدني, romanized: Akādīmīyat Muḥammad al-Sādis al-Dawlīyah lil-Ṭayarān al-Madanī, French: Académie internationale Mohammed VI de l'aviation civile, AIMAC) is a public aviation university created in 2000 by King Mohammed VI of Morocco in order to train air traffic controllers, air traffic safety electronics personnel and aerospace engineers. Under the supervision of the Moroccan Airports Authority and the Ministry of Equipment and Transport, the university is based on the recommendations of the International Civil Aviation Organization.

== International partners ==
The academy has received the ICAO agreement as the first French speaking training center of "Trainair" network. The École nationale de l'aviation civile (ENAC) of Toulouse is linked to the university by a partnership agreement, in particularly for air navigation courses. Moreover, in December 2011, the academy has signed a partnership with this university and the École des Ponts ParisTech for the creation of an executive aviation MBA at Casablanca in March 2012. The Federal Aviation Administration is also a partner of AIMAC, in particular for the launch of common e-learning courses.

The academy has been chosen by Concordia University for the development of a regional center of this Canadian university at Casablanca to provide MBA courses in aviation.

Mohammed VI Academy has other partnership such as Eurocontrol and Aéroport de Paris.
