= Rangueil =

- Part of Toulouse
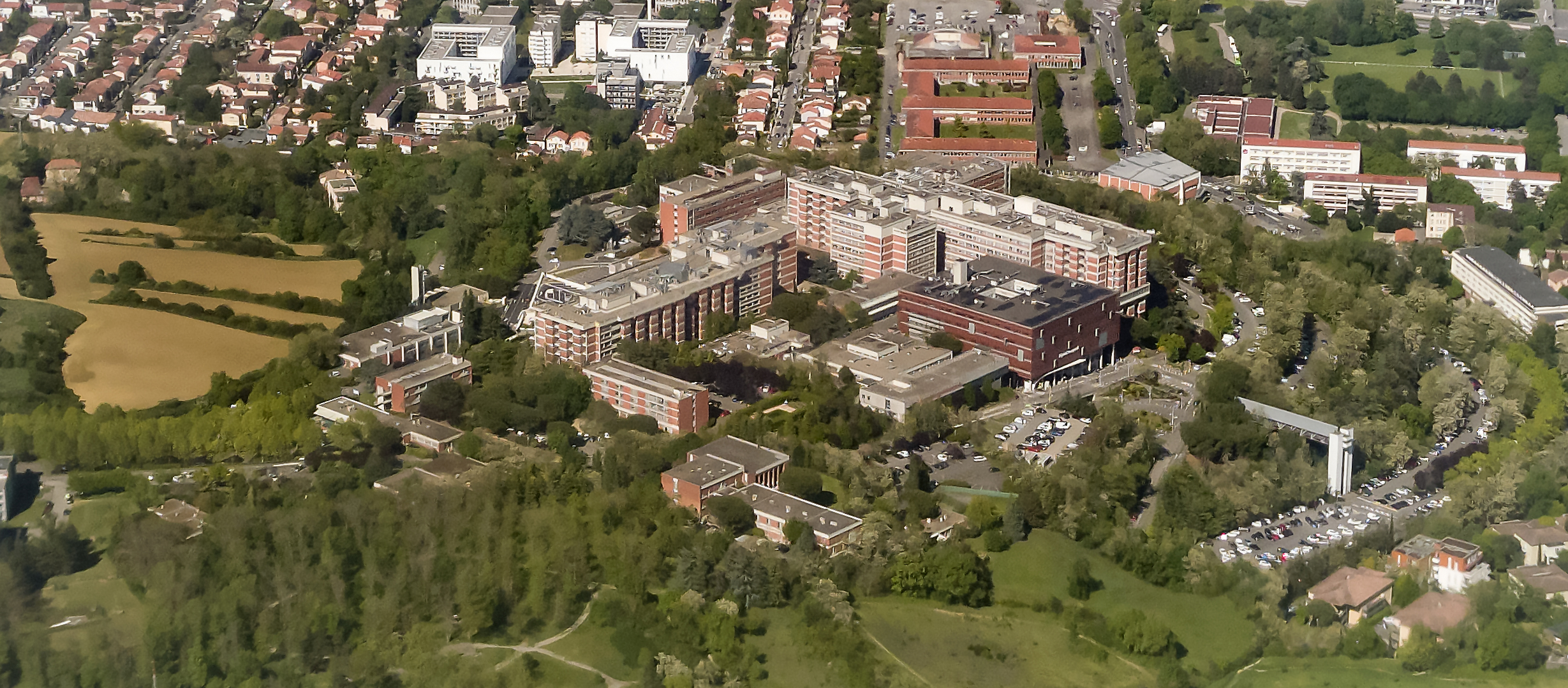
- Rangueil Hospital
- Location of Rangueil
- Location within France Location within Occitanie
- Coordinates: 43°33′58″N 1°27′30″E
- Country: France
- Region: Occitania
- Department: Haute-Garonne
- Arrondissement: Toulouse
- Canton: Toulouse-11
- Commune: Toulouse
- Area^{1}: 0.18 km^{2} (0.069 sq mi)
- Population (2018): 2,295
  - Density: 13,000/km^{2} (33,000/sq mi)
- Time zone: UTC+01:00 (CET)
  - Summer (DST): UTC+02:00 (CEST)
- ^{1} French Land Register data, which excludes lakes, ponds, glaciers > 1 km^{2} (0.386 sq mi or 247 acres) and river estuaries.

Rangueil (French pronunciation: [ʁɑ̃ɡœj]; Languedocien: Ranguèlh) is a residential area south-east of Toulouse in Haute-Garonne, France, where grandes écoles and Universities are located as well as an important scientific complex. It has 2,295 inhabitants (2018).

== Schools ==
- École nationale de l'aviation civile (ENAC)
- Paul Sabatier University (UPS)
- University Institutes of Technology

== Sciences Institutions ==
- CNES (National Centre for Space Studies, French: Centre national d'études spatiales)
- Centre national de la recherche scientifique (CNRS)
- Institut de recherche en informatique de Toulouse (IRIT-CNRS)
- Laboratory for Analysis and Architecture of Systems (LAAS-CNRS)
- Institut de Formation en Soins Infirmiers (IFSI)
- Institut national des sciences appliquées de Toulouse (INSA)
- Institut supérieur de l'aéronautique et de l'espace (ISAE)
- Institut de Mathématiques de Toulouse (IMT)
- Observatoire Midi-Pyrénées (OMP)

== Hospitals ==
- Rangueil Hospital

== Transport ==
Toulouse Metro Line B Rangueil station.

== See also ==
- Ramonville-Saint-Agne
