= Toulouse School of Aviation and Aerospace Engineering =

French engineering aerospace college

Coordinates: 43°33′51.509″N 1°28′54.018″E

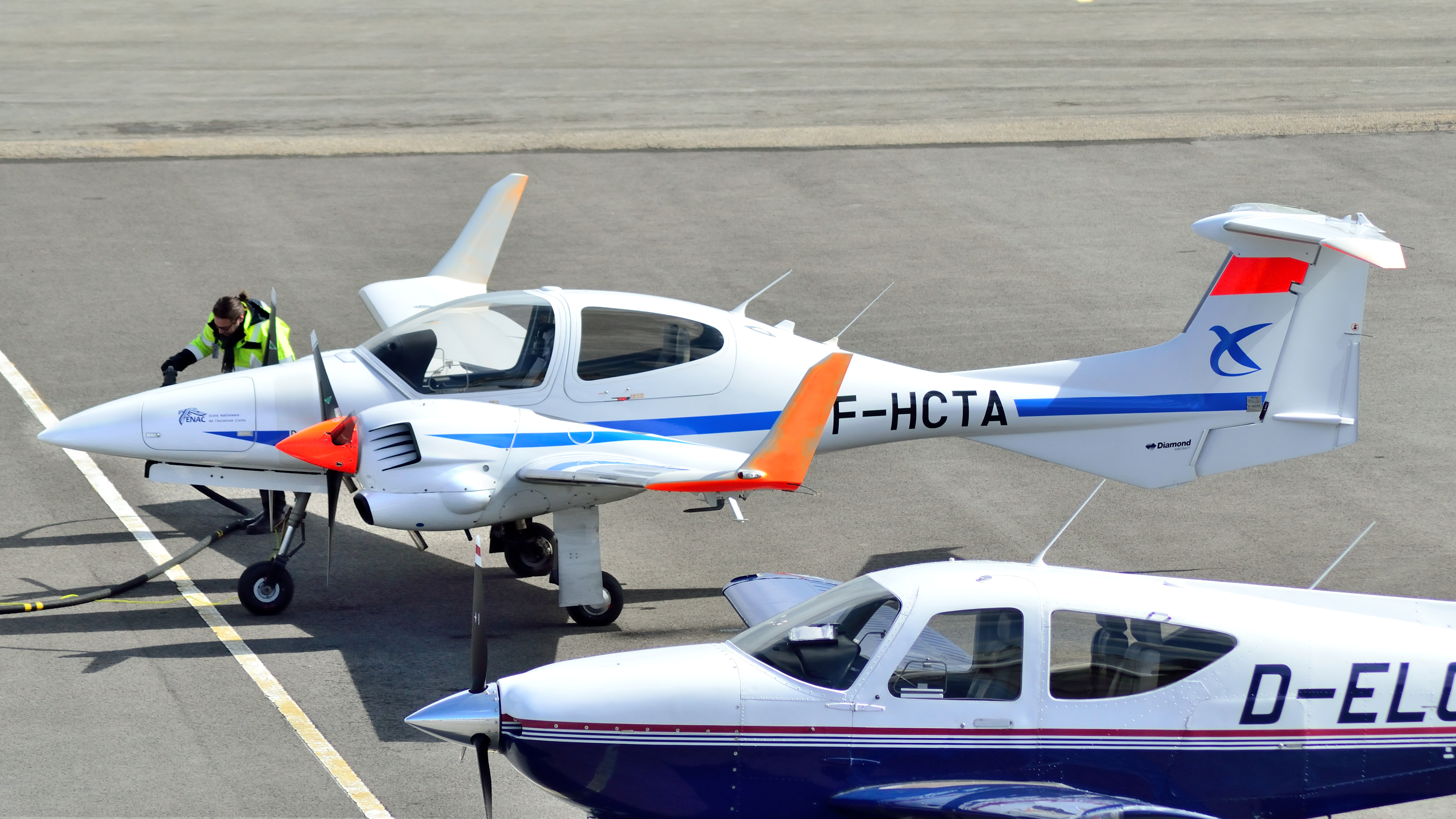
- ENAC's Diamond DA42 Twin Star on the apron at Le Touquet–Elizabeth II Airport in 2018
- Motto: Build what only others imagine
- Type: Groupement d'intérêt public
- Established: 2025; 1 year ago
- Location: Toulouse, France
- Website: www.tsaae.fr/en

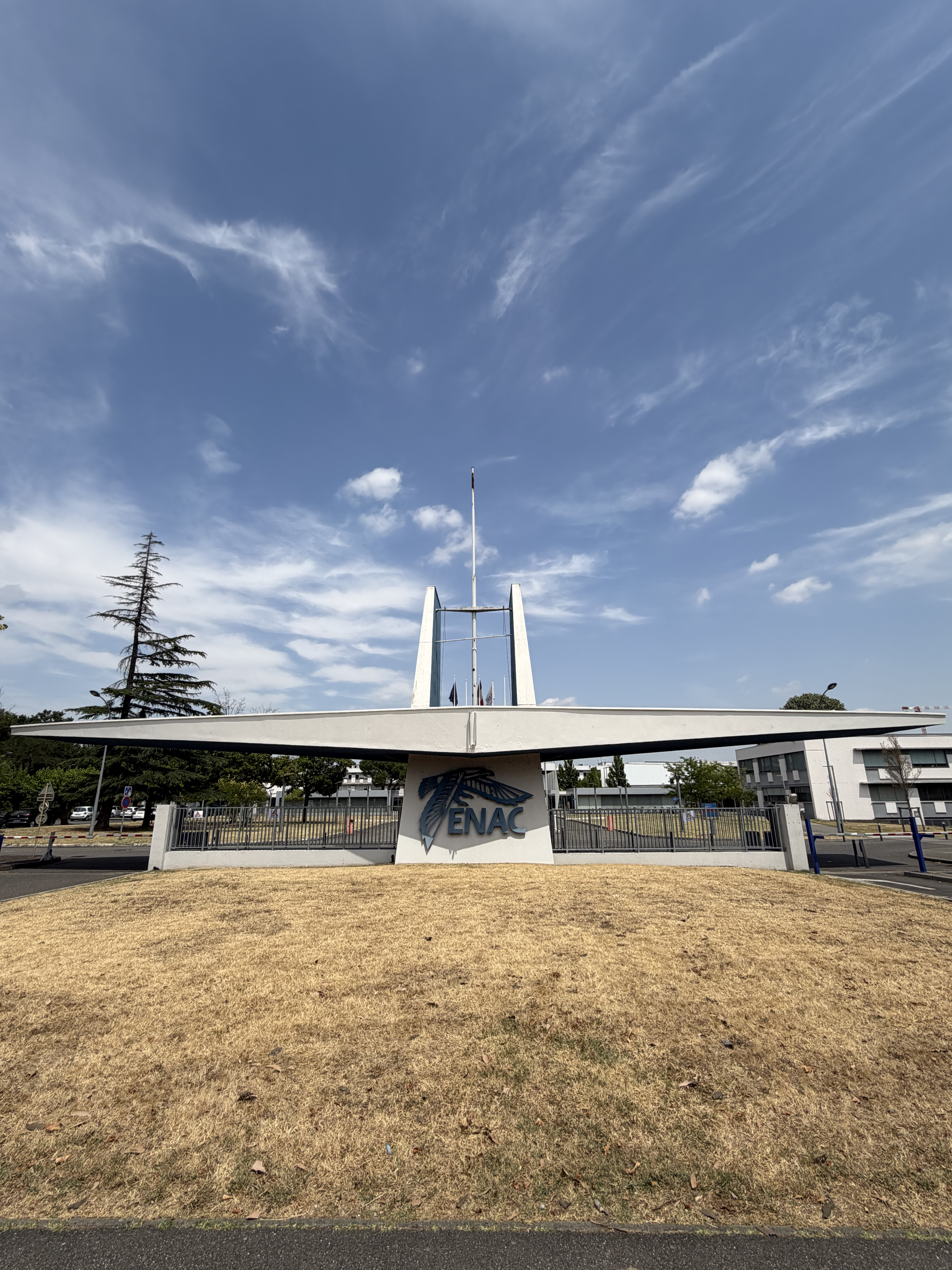
ENAC main entrance

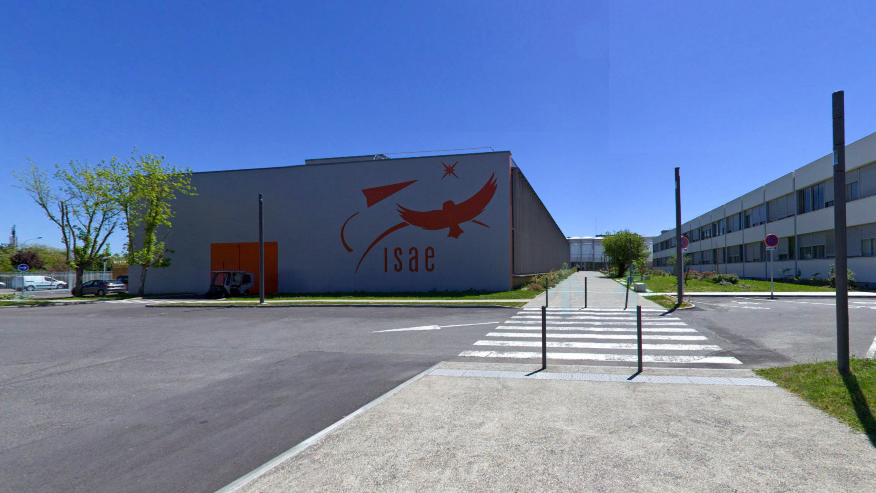
ISAE-SUPAERO main entrance

The Toulouse School of Aviation and Aerospace Engineering or TSAAE is an aerospace engineering college located in Toulouse, France.

It is a French Groupement d'intérêt public and part of the University of Toulouse. It has been established in June 2025 as a result of a collaboration between ENAC and ISAE-SUPAERO.

This joint venture is a public interest group and bring together specialized international training, research, and innovation.

ENAC and ISAE-SUPAERO have the stated goal of making the school a "global center for aerospace". Currently, nearly 600 international students are enrolled in these programs at the two schools based in Toulouse.

TSAAE has an aerospace and air transport research laboratory, TSAAE LAB, as well as an incubator dedicated to entrepreneurship.

== See also ==
- List of aerospace engineering schools
