= École africaine de la météorologie et de l'aviation civile =

African School of Meteorology and Civil Aviation
- École Africaine de la Météorologie et de l'Aviation Civile
- Type: Public establishment of an administrative nature
- Established: 1963
- Director: Mathiaco Bessane
- Students: 450
- Location: Niamey, Niger
- Website: eamac.ne

The African School of Meteorology and Civil Aviation (EAMAC) is a public establishment of an administrative nature in Africa established in 1963 and located in Niamey, Niger. The school trains aeronautical engineers, technicians, and air traffic controllers. It is one of the three training schools of the Agency for Aerial Navigation Safety in Africa and Madagascar (ASECNA).

== International partners ==
- French Civil Aviation University
- National School of Meteorology (France)
- OMN
- EUMETSAT
- International Civil Aviation Organization
