= Groupement des écoles d'aéronautique =

The Groupement des écoles d'aéronautique (GEA France) (in English French aeronautical universities network) includes three French national aerospace engineering grandes écoles focused on this scope:

- École nationale de l'aviation civile (ÉNAC), Aix-en-Provence, Carcassonne, Castelnaudary, Toulouse, Muret, Montpellier, Grenoble, Biscarrosse, Château-Arnoux-Saint-Auban, Saint-Yan et Melun,
- École nationale supérieure de mécanique et d'aérotechnique (ISAE-ENSMA), Poitiers,
- Institut Supérieur de l'Aéronautique et de l'Espace (ISAE-SUPAERO), Toulouse.

== The Institut sino-européen d'ingénierie de l'aviation of Tianjin ==
The Institut sino-européen d'ingénierie de l'aviation (Sino-European Institute of Aviation Engineering) of Tianjin has been created by the GEA grandes écoles, in partnership with DGAC and French companies (EADS, Airbus, Thales, Eurocopter, Safran) as part of a Franco-Chinese cooperation following the implantation of an Airbus A320 assembly plant in Tianjin. The university opened in October 2007, trains Chinese students. They follow a course in aerospace engineering, taught in French and in six years, a first year of learning the French language, followed by two years of classes préparatoires and three years of aeronautical engineering.

== Mastères Spécialisés in Tianjin ==
Not linked with the engineering training, three Mastères Spécialisés are taught at the Institut sino-européen d'ingénierie de l'aviation of Tianjin:

- Mastère Spécialisé Aviation Safety management : aeronautical maintenance;
- Mastère Spécialisé Aviation Safety management : airworthiness;
- Mastère Spécialisé Aviation Safety management : flight operations.

These courses are for Chinese students who wants to join the aeronautical sector.
