= ENAC Foundation =

French foundation

- Motto in English: Dream Bigger Fly Better
- Type: Nonprofit
- Established: 2012
- President: Alexandre Fouet
- Location: Toulouse, Occitania, France
- Colours: Blue and Grey
- Website: fondation.enac.fr

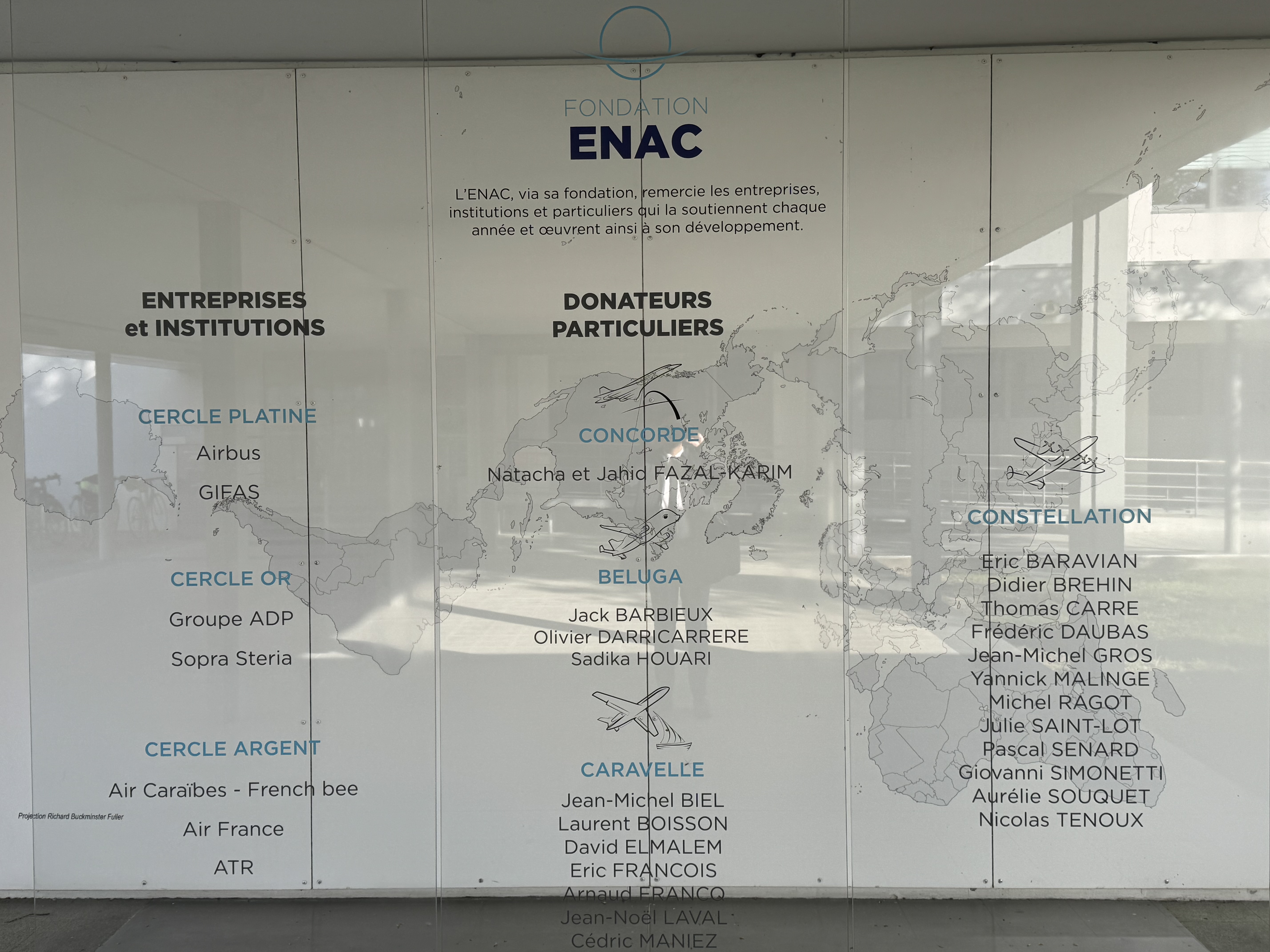
ENAC Foundation Donors wall

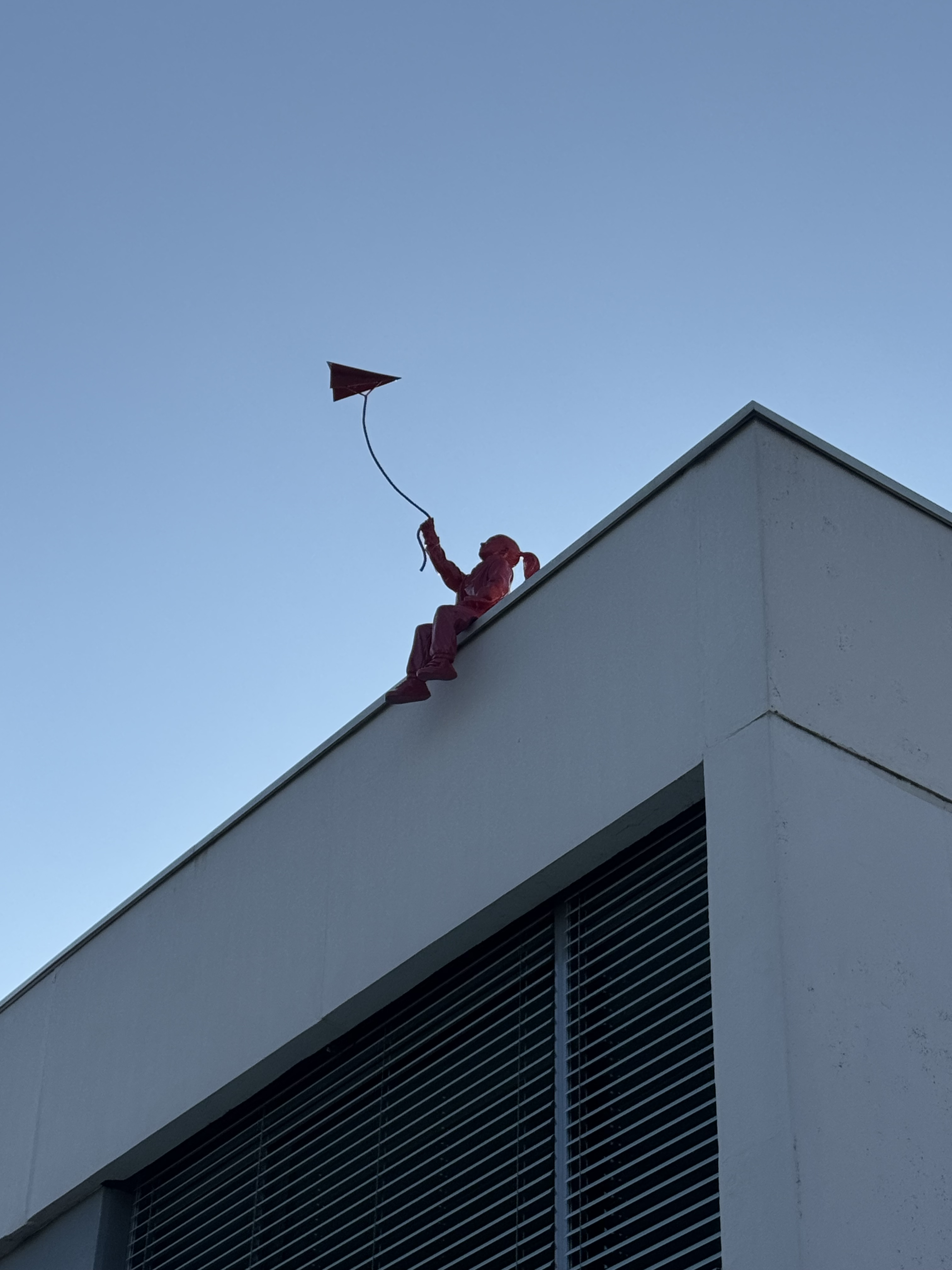
Sculpture "The Granddaughter with a Kite" by James Colomina visible on the Toulouse campus and financed by the ENAC Foundation

The ENAC Foundation (French: Fondation de l'École nationale de l'aviation civile) was founded in 2012. The goal of the Foundation, as was put forward by École nationale de l'aviation civile, is to promote scientific and public interest activities in aviation, aerospace and aeronautics.

== History ==
In 2009, the school and its alumni association organized the first edition of the aeronautical book fair. In December 2010, ENAC became one of the ICAO's aviation security training centres.

After the creation of the Foundation in 2012, the first scholarships have been given in 2014, in order to promote international mobility. In 2015, the first research chair in UAV is built, in partnership with Ineo, Cofely and Sagem.

The foundation is supported by GIFAS since 2017.

== See also ==
- Science and technology in France
- Grandes écoles
