= Franck Goldnadel =

- Born: 14 August 1969 (age 56); La Ferté-Macé
- Education: Aerospace engineer
- Alma mater: École nationale de l'aviation civile
- Known for: Director of Paris-Charles de Gaulle Airport
- Predecessor: Patrice Hardel
- Successor: Marc Houalla

Franck Goldnadel (born 14 August 1969) is a French public servant and former director of Paris-Charles de Gaulle Airport.

== Biography ==
Graduating from the École nationale de l'aviation civile (French civil aviation academy, promotion 1990), he started his career in 1993 at the air transport department of ENAC where he was working on the Airbus training programs. From 1994 to 1997, he was commercial manager of Alyzia Airport Services, subsidiary of Aéroports de Paris for ground handling services. He joins Aéroports de Paris in 1997 where he would become director of Paris-Orly Airport and then head of the Terminal 2 at Paris-Charles de Gaulle Airport. On 1 March 2011 Goldnadel was appointed director of Charles de Gaulle Airport. He left his position in February 2018, replaced by Marc Houalla.

== Awards ==
- Officer of the Ordre national du Mérite since 14 November 2016. He was knighted 24 June 2009.

== Bibliography ==
- Académie nationale de l'air et de l'espace and Lucien Robineau, Les français du ciel, dictionnaire historique, Le Cherche midi, June 2005, 782 p. (ISBN 2-7491-0415-7)
