= École nationale de l'aviation civile =

University of civil aviation

Coordinates: 43°33′55″N 1°28′52″E

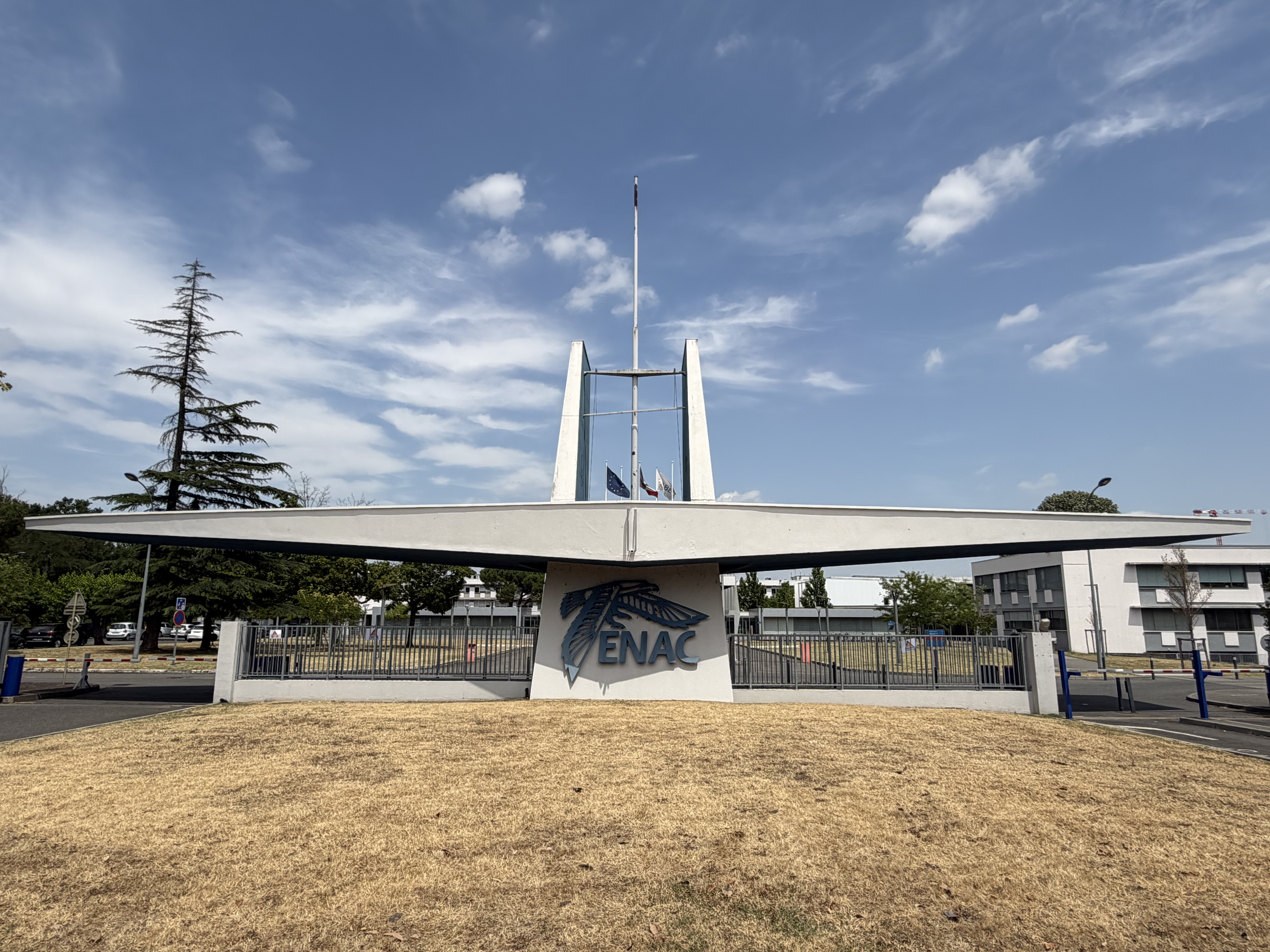
- Other name: ENAC
- Motto: La référence aéronautique
- Motto in English: The aeronautical standard
- Type: Grande école
- Established: 1949
- Academic affiliations: 3AF, Aerospace Valley, CDEFI, CESAER, CGE, CTI, Elles Bougent, Erasmus, EUR-ACE, France AEROTECH, GEA, IAAPS, ICAO, ISSAT, PEGASUS, Toulouse Tech, University of Toulouse
- General Director: Olivier Chansou
- Administrative staff: 910
- Students: 3,000 (in 2017)
- Doctoral students: 80
- Location: Biscarrosse, Carcassonne, Castelnaudary, Château-Arnoux-Saint-Auban, Grenoble, Melun, Montpellier, Muret, Saint-Yan and Toulouse, France
- Campus: Biscarrosse - Parentis Airport, Carcassonne Airport, Castelnaudary - Villeneuve Airport, Château-Arnoux-Saint-Auban Airport, Grenoble-Isère Airport, Melun Villaroche Aerodrome, Montpellier – Méditerranée Airport, Muret - Lherm Aerodrome, Saint-Yan Airport and Toulouse
- Colours: Blue and grey
- Website: www.enac.fr

The École nationale de l'aviation civile (French pronunciation: [ekɔl nɑsjɔnal də lavjɑsjɔ̃ sivil]; English: National School of Civil Aviation; abbr. ENAC; Occitan: Escòla Nacionala d'Avion Civil) is one of 205 colleges (as of September 2018) accredited to award engineering degrees in France. ENAC is designated as a grande école by the Conférence des Grandes écoles (CGE), a non-profit organisation which certifies and monitors grandes écoles (including engineering colleges). ENAC was founded on 28 August 1949 to provide initial and continuing education in the field of civil aviation. The school is an établissement public à caractère scientifique, culturel et professionnel (a public scientific, cultural or professional establishment), and operates under the oversight of the Ministry of Ecological Transition. Affiliated with the University of Toulouse and Aerospace Valley, it is one of the five founders of France AEROTECH.

ENAC offers 30 engineering and technical programs in civil aviation and aeronautics. Programs include aerospace engineering, aircraft maintenance, commercial airline piloting, air traffic control, and flight instructor. The college also offers three Master of Science programs and 12 Advanced Master programs for students with relevant experience.

== History ==
=== Origins ===
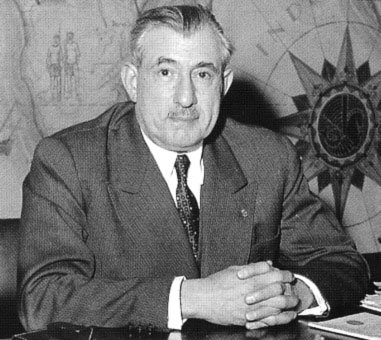
Max Hymans was secretary general of civil and commercial aviation between 1945 and 1948.

In 1945, immediately after World War II, the French air-transport industry experienced rapid growth. To ensure safety and compliance with regulations, demand for qualified staff was high; there was a need to harmonise communications among sectors of the aviation industry. ENAC was founded to address this issue. Among its founders was Max Hymans, the secretary general of civil and commercial aviation.

During the postwar years, there was a lack of unity in the civil-aviation industry due to the hasty recruitment of large numbers of people from different backgrounds. To standardize personnel, a number of training centers were created. Airfield commanders were trained in Orly, and navigation staff were trained in Le Bourget. Wireless operators and radiotelegraph technicians were also trained in Orly by the Department of Telecommunications and Signaling. Technical managers were primarily trained in engineering schools, including Arts et Métiers and the National School of Meteorology (École nationale de la météorologie). Designers were trained by the École spéciale des travaux aéronautiques, and aircrew were trained by other public or private institutions. ENAC's mission was to coordinate the training of aviation personnel.

In Decree No. 49-970 (7 June 1948), the rules of French public administration were codified. The regulations applying to civil-aviation officials were overhauled, affecting the technical staff in particular. Several new groups of civil servants were established: air traffic engineers, air navigation operation engineers, aerial telecommunication civil engineers, air traffic controllers, telecommunication controllers and air navigation agents. The creation of these groups was followed by a ministerial decision on 12 August 1948 which paved the way for the first recruitment by competitive examination, which was held in October 1948. On 14 April 1948, the International Civil Aviation Organization established requirements for aircrew licensing, including a minimum number of flight hours for each category of pilot.

Before adopting the name ENAC, the school was called a "service of education and internships" (service des écoles et des stages) and was funded by the general secretariat for civil and commercial aviation. This contrasted with the tradition of French civil-service personnel being trained in grandes écoles. Jules Moch, the Minister of Works, Transport and Tourism, unsuccessfully proposed the name "École nationale de l'aviation marchande".

=== Aviation-safety university in Paris ===
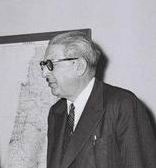
Jules Moch in 1957

ENAC was created on 28 August 1949 (Decree 49–1205) in Paris at the initiative of Secretary General of Civil Aviation Max Hymans and Jules Moch to train professionals in civil aeronautics and coordinate all air-transport stakeholders, including aircrew, technicians, and civil servants. The university is in Orly, south of Paris; ENAC's buildings at Orly were an examination center until the early 1990s. René Lemaire considers ENAC "a university of aviation safety". Aviation safety is synonymous with ENAC, since it was the rationale for the training of technicians and airmen at a single school.

As noted in a report of the inspection générale de l'aviation civile, "It was in the minds of the creators of the university to develop between the aircrew and the ground staff a community of ideas, reciprocal knowledge, and esteem, that are essential for the teamwork required by air transport." However, it is doubtful that the report's "community of ideas" could be only expressed by courses at the same university. Other factors were different lengths of training; air navigation civil engineers in the telecommunications branch study for 30 months at the university; operations students are trained in 27 months; air-navigation engineers in two years, and air traffic controllers in nine months. A consistent education was provided to students in different cycles, integrating programs.

=== First partners ===
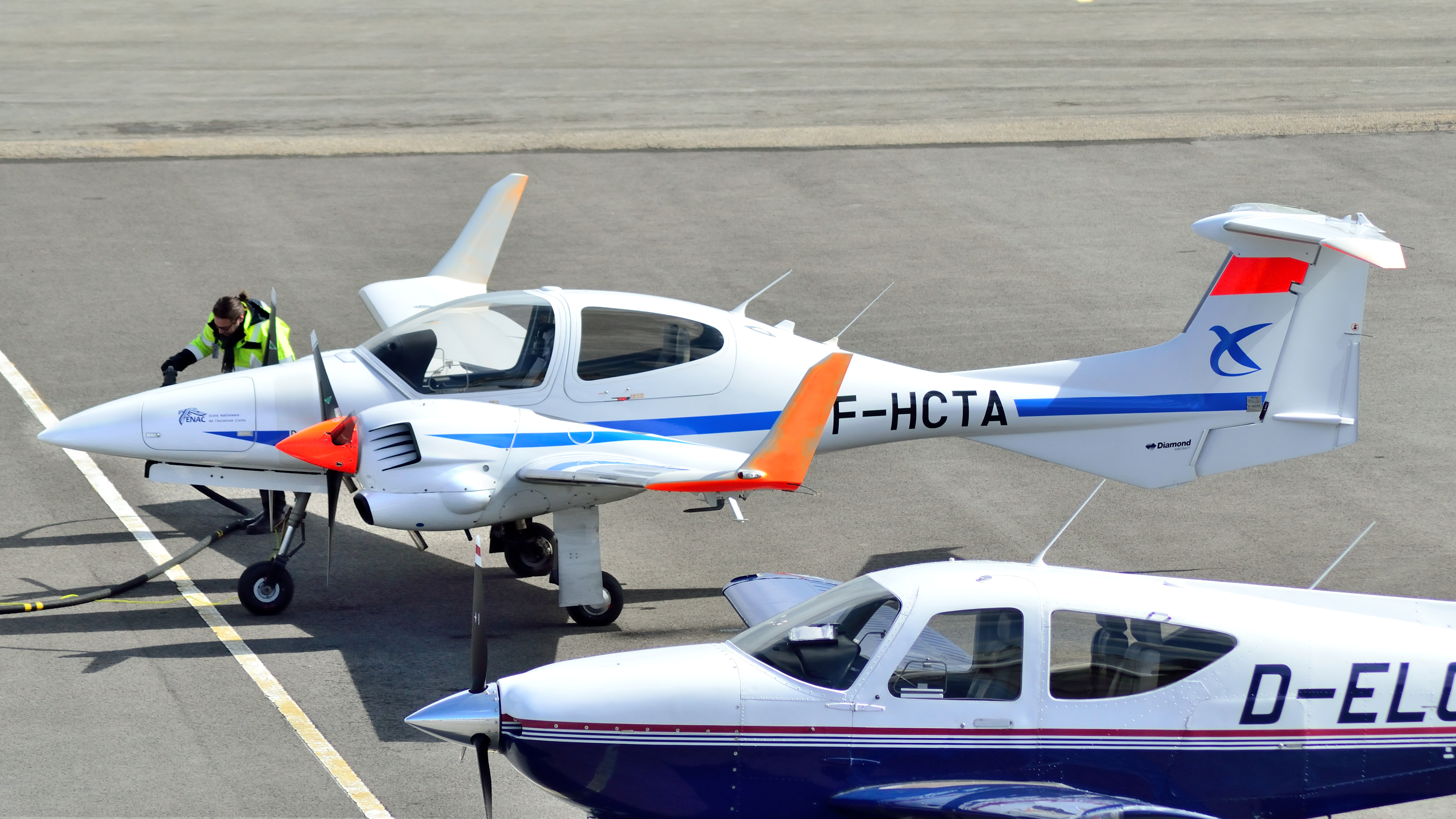
ENAC's F-HCTA at Le Touquet. The aircraft is based at Muret-Lherm

On 13 October 1959, the first major partner of the university was recognised; this enabled the recruitment of pilots with no previous flight experience. The previous year, the university held training sessions on an experimental basis and was responsible for teaching theory for the airline transport pilot licence. Flight training was provided at the Service d'exploitation de la formation aéronautique (SEFA) center at Saint-Yan Airport (opened in 1949) until students received a commercial pilot licence; advanced training was provided at the Air France school. ENAC also provided theoretical training for pilots of a number of airlines, and the question of cost arose. The expensive training, not paid by France, was eventually borne by private airlines.

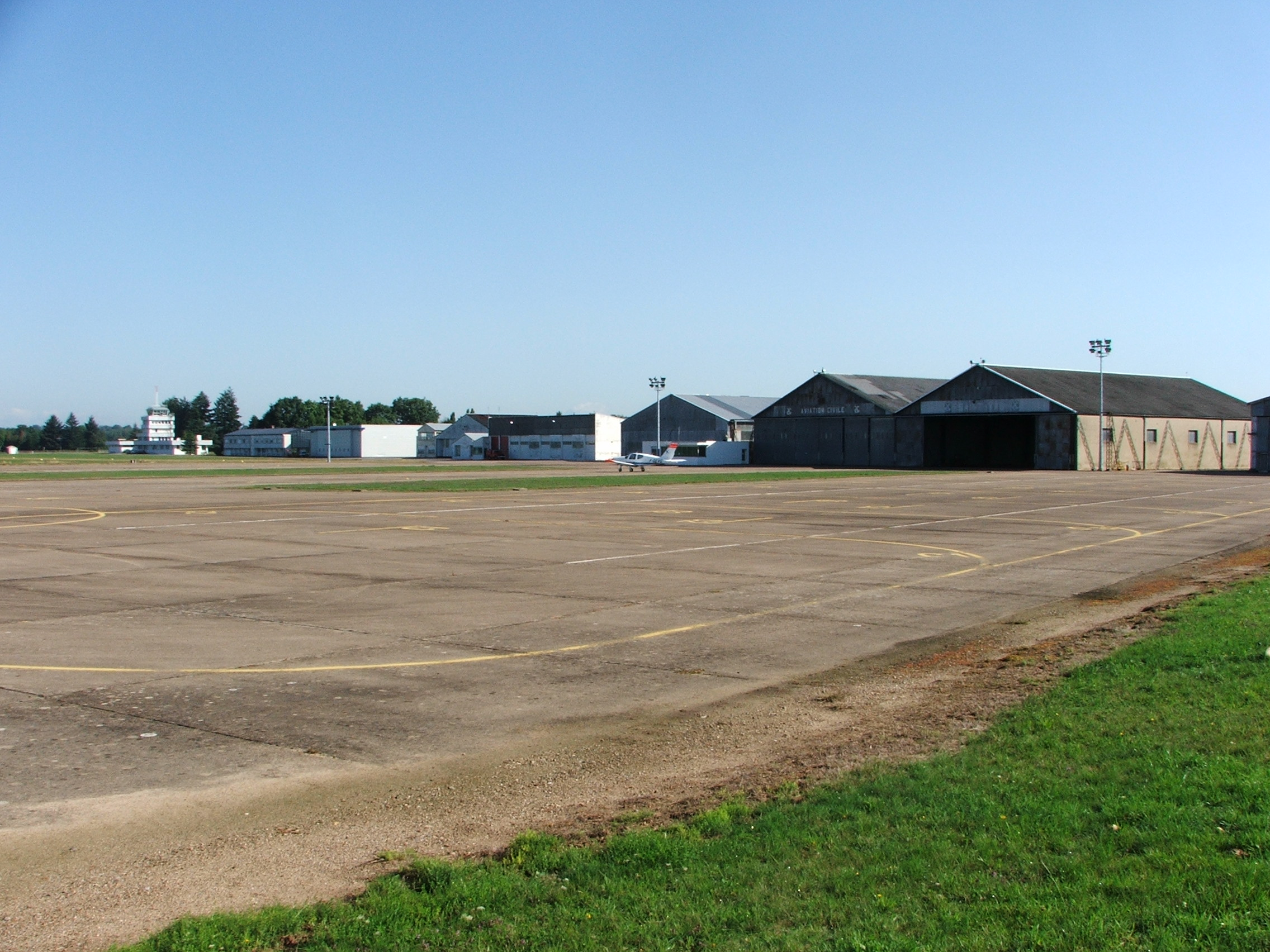
ENAC buildings and aircraft at Saint-Yan Airport

To give its students a thorough understanding of the air-transport environment, ENAC sought to cooperate with the École nationale de la météorologie; a 29 May 1950 report noted the influence of meteorology on air traffic control and advocated meteorological training for air-traffic controllers. Close links also traditionally existed between civil aviation and the Air Force. After World War II, as civil aviation was developing, members of the armed forces participated in its expansion. Pilots, radio operators, navigators and mechanics came from the military to the airlines, and ENAC sought to convert military aircrews. On 9 June 1951, a memorandum specifying the school's responsibilities in the training of military pilots for civil aviation was signed. The university was the general contractor of operations, and provided theoretical training. In accordance with a of 31 March 1951 decree, the Service de l'aviation légère et sportive (SALS) provided free flight training for pilot candidates coming from the army.

From 1949 to 1959, the number of courses increased from six to 64 and the number of students from 49 to 800. ENAC benefited from the postwar development of aviation, and a number of students came from foreign countries or (in particular) overseas territories which later became independent. During the early 1960s, the university began to accept its first students from foreign civil-aviation authorities. Along with enrollment growth, courses were created to keep pace with new ratings. The navigation-instructor rating was introduced in 1956, and corresponding training began. Courses were sometimes introduced to meet a need, such as a speaking-technique course for instructors that year. The first civilian engineering students were also admitted in 1956. In 1958, the airline-pilot theoretical training course began. Students took an annual trip from ENAC Orly, and were received (in full uniform) by local authorities on their arrival.

=== Transition ===
The university underwent significant changes between 1960 and 1975. It moved to Toulouse in 1968, where the main campus is still located. In 1970, the status of the university was changed from a department of the DGAC to a public institution.

The school was originally located on the outskirts of Paris-Orly Airport, France's largest. Its location offered easy access to planes for navigation flights, promotional trips and other activities; leaders of nearby airlines, aircraft manufacturers and other aviation-related businesses could come to the university for lectures and conferences.

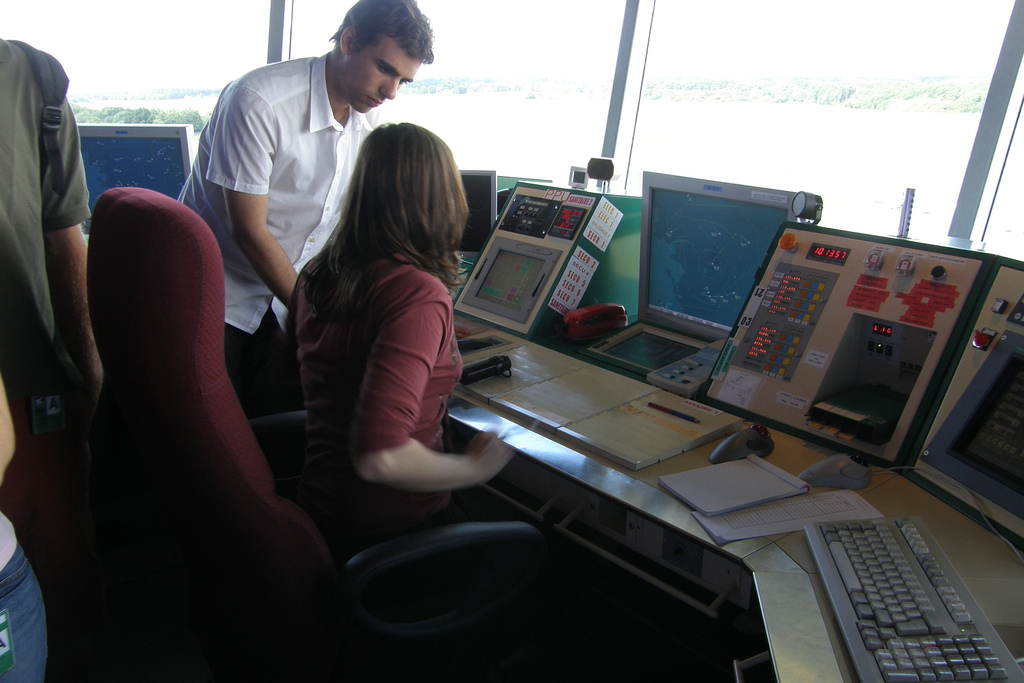
Students and air-traffic controllers in the Nantes Atlantique Airport control tower

However, the rapid growth of traffic at Paris-Orly before the construction of Charles de Gaulle Airport brought new challenges. Requirements for ENAC's aircraft became more stringent, and Aéroports de Paris became increasingly reluctant to renew the university's lease. During the early 1960s, the future of the Orly facilities was uncertain.

Earlier, in the mid-1950s, the possibility of moving ENAC to a new location was considered. Potential locations were cities near Paris airports; between 1954 and 1957, Thiais, Rungis, Issy-les-Moulineaux, Les Mureaux and Le Bourget were considered. Regional decentralization became a priority, even before the publication of Jean-François Gravier's Paris et le désert français (Paris and the French Desert). Plans to keep ENAC near Paris seemed increasingly doubtful, and more-distant locations began to be considered. Within a 150-kilometre-mile (93 mi) radius of the capital, cities under consideration included Melun, Pontoise, Coulommiers, Étampes, Reims, Évreux, Chartres and Orléans. A 20 May 1959 report listed the disadvantages of a location too distant from Paris, however, such as the difficulty of transporting personnel, the possible extension of courses, and increased operating costs.

René Lemaire proposed moving the school to Toulouse in a 14 June 1960 report. The city's aeronautical infrastructure and long history as a university town made it an attractive location: the (University of Toulouse, founded in 1229, is one of France's oldest universities. École nationale supérieure d'ingénieurs de constructions aéronautiques (ENSICA) settled in Toulouse in 1961, and École nationale supérieure de l'aéronautique et de l'espace (SUPAERO) was going to move from Paris to the city. ENAC's transfer to Toulouse was approved by Prime Minister Michel Debré on 15 June 1961 and confirmed by his successor, Georges Pompidou, in a 23 July 1963 letter.

Building construction on the Rangueil campus began in April 1966, and was completed on 19 August 1968. The academic year began on 16 September of that year. Five hundred students were expected, including 325 who were beginning their training. The new students consisted of 15 air-navigation engineering students drawn largely from École Polytechnique, 70 engineering students in air navigation from classes préparatoires aux grandes écoles, 60 airline-pilot students, 100 air-traffic controller students, 40 electronics students, 20 commercial-pilot students and 20 flight dispatcher students.

=== Public administrative institution ===
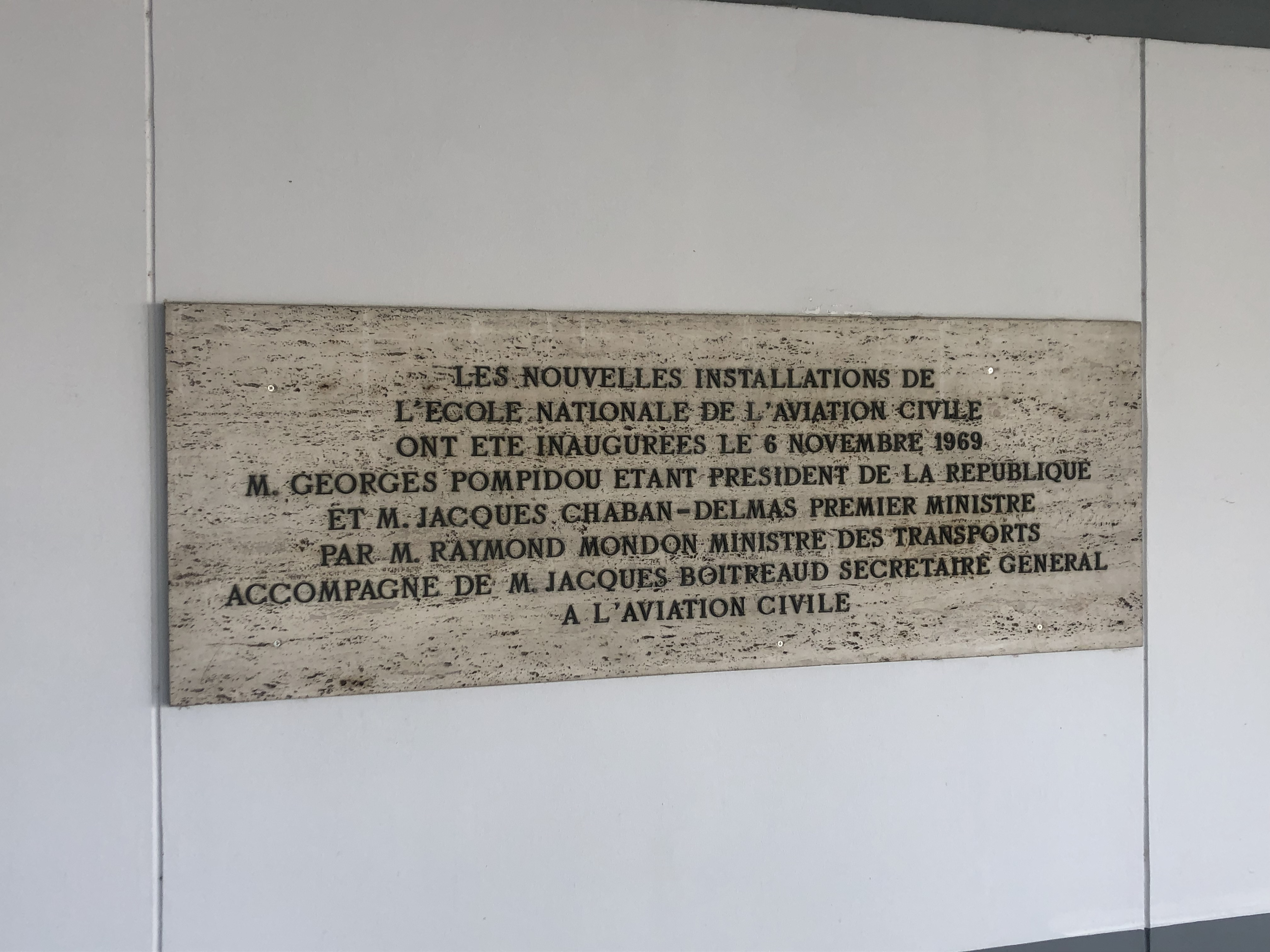
Plaque commemorating the 1969 opening of the Toulouse campus

The Commission permanente began to examine the university's ambiguous legal status, a problem since it was founded. ENAC was closely monitored by its supervisory authority. Inspection reports (published once every two years or less) were frequently critical of the school, with those published in the mid-1950s beginning to question its existence. The confidential 12 March 1952 Brancourt Controller said that the university had "a lack of curriculum", "there is ... tension with the training center of Air France", and "ENAC is a mistake".

These difficulties were largely due to incompatibility between ENAC and the civil-aviation industry, which required it to provide courses for students and trainees who were not necessarily officials of the Direction générale de l'aviation civile (DGAC, its supervisory authority) and to use a varied teaching staff. The university budget also presented a challenges after other types of income, such as non-public resources, were reduced (particularly between 1958 and 1964). In 1962, ENAC considered raising tuition, course prices and fees for non-DGAC students. The school's status required a complex approval process, however, and a status of public administrative institution seemed more appropriate. The decision was made in the 13 April 1970 Decree No. 70-347, which took effect on 1 January 1971. ENAC established a board of directors, with René Lemaire its first president.

=== New missions ===
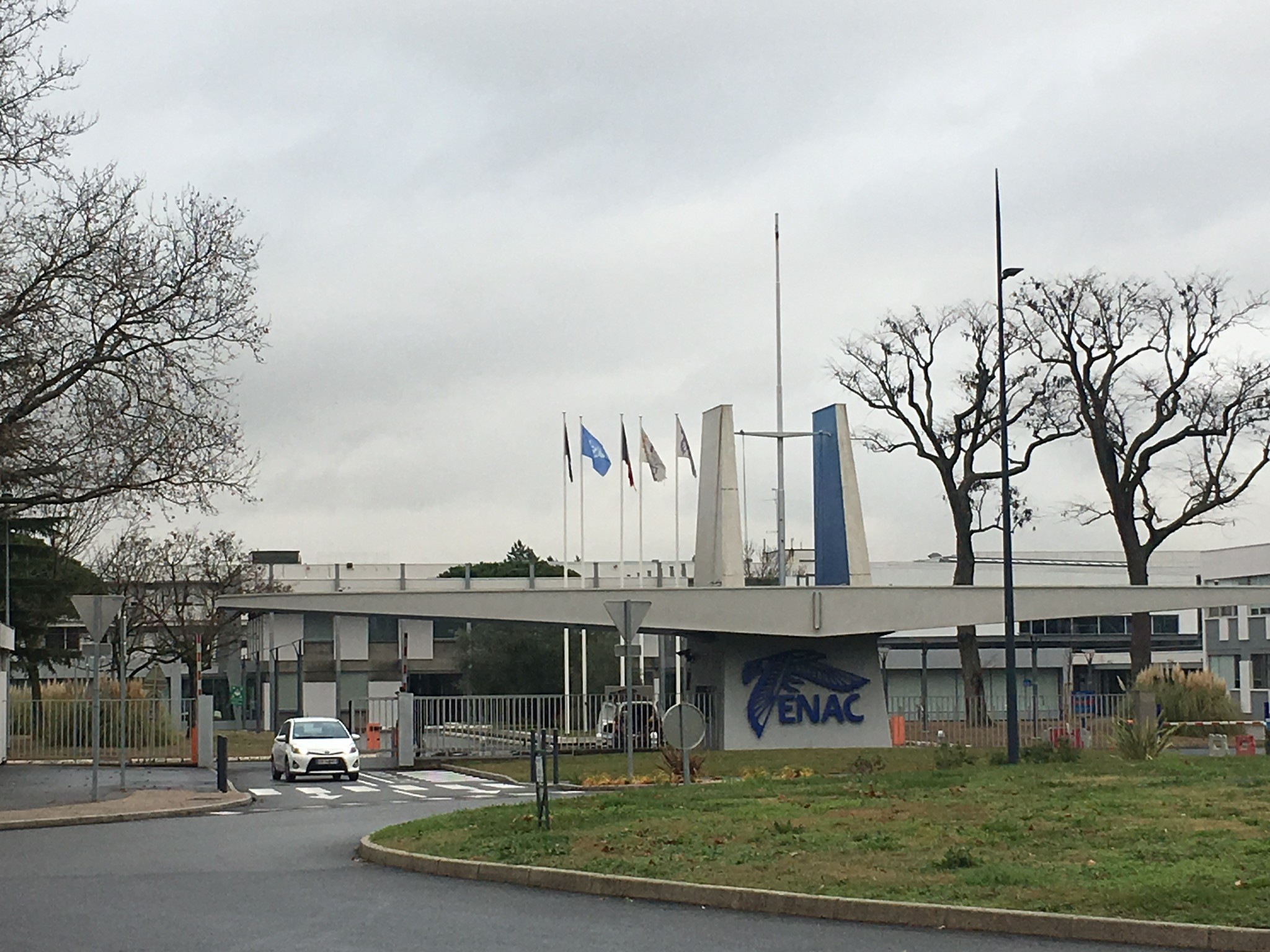
ENAC Toulouse entrance

In 1975, the number of non-civil-service engineering students began to increase. ENAC is becoming important in training civilian aerospace personnel; its primary purpose had been to train civil servants. Civilian students are not new; the first were admitted in 1956. ENAC's engineering program, focused on electronics and information technology, has made the university a de facto engineering grande école.

Industry-oriented university research appeared in 1984, in accordance with the higher-education law which mandates that "engineering education [...] has a research activity, basic or applied", organized around four areas: electronics, automation, computers and aviation economics. The university instructs future engineers in research methods; deductive reasoning, long favored by teachers in the classes préparatoires aux grandes écoles and grandes écoles, has been inferior to the inductive reasoning characteristic of engineering research. The growing interest in research includes air navigation.

Mastère spécialisé programs emerged during the mid-1980s for the industrial GIFAS (Groupement des industries françaises aéronautiques et spatiales), training foreign executives in a relatively-short time in addition to French students and professionals. Continuing education diversified at the same time in five main areas: air-traffic control, electronics, computers, aeronautics and languages.

=== International dimension ===
The university's international dimension grew significantly during the 1990s, but was hampered by new training requirements for air-traffic controllers. ENAC participated in European projects such as EATCHIP (European Air Traffic Control Harmonization and Integration Program), and offered student-mobility programs through the Erasmus and Socrates programmes. The university began to welcome a growing number of foreign students, and formed close ties with foreign universities such as Technische Universität Berlin and Technische Universität Darmstadt in Germany and the University of Tampere in Finland. At that time, ENAC created the Groupement des écoles d'aéronautique (GEA France) with the Institut supérieur de l'aéronautique et de l'espace (ISAE) and École nationale supérieure de mécanique et d'aérotechnique (ENSMA). The three grandes écoles of this network, in partnership with the DGAC and French companies such as EADS, Airbus, Thales, Eurocopter, and Safran), founded the Institut sino-européen d'ingénierie de l'aviation (Chinese-European Aviation Engineering Institute) in Tianjin in 2007, with master's and mastère spécialisé programs for Chinese students. During the 2000s, courses in English and activities focused on air navigation were developed. In 2009, the university and its alumni association organized the first aeronautical literary festival in Toulouse. ENAC became an ICAO center for training in aviation security in December 2010.

The university established new teaching facilities: the CAUTRA air traffic control simulator, the AERSIM aerodrome control simulator, an Airbus A320 flight management system simulator, a static model of the CFM 56-5B engine for the A321, and a telecom-network laboratory. ENAC became Europe's largest aviation university on 1 January 2011, when it merged with SEFA. In 2013, the university and DGAC introduced the groupement d'intérêt économique DSNA Services (later France Aviation Civile Services).

In June 2025, the school created the Toulouse School of Aviation and Aerospace Engineering in partnership with ISAE-SUPAERO.

=== Directors ===
The current director of the university is Olivier Chansou, who succeeded former SEFA director Marc Houalla. Chansou, the school's eighth director, was elected on 27 November 2017.

ENAC directors
Name	Term	Occupation
Guy du Merle (1908–1993)	1948–1951	Aerospace engineer, test pilot, writer
Gilbert Manuel (1913–2010)	1951–1967	Telecommunications engineer
Louis Pailhas (born 1926)	1967–1982	Aerospace engineer
André Sarreméjean	1982–1990	Aerospace engineer
Alain Soucheleau	1990–1999	Aerospace engineer
Gérard Rozenknop (born 1950)	1999–2008	Aerospace engineer
Marc Houalla (born 1961)	2008–2017	Aerospace engineer, manager
Olivier Chansou (born 1965)	2017–present	Aerospace engineer

== Administration ==
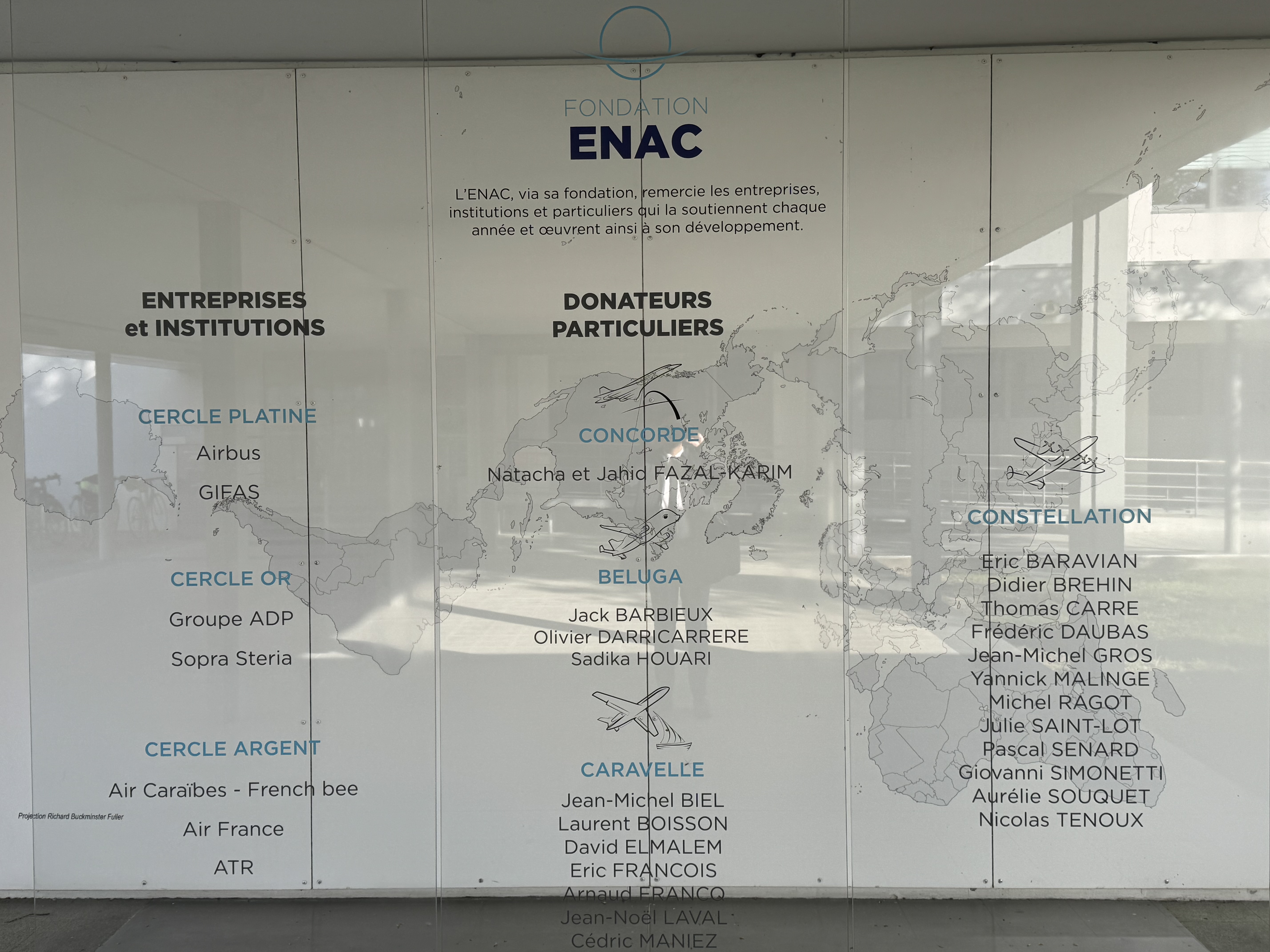
ENAC Foundation Donors wall

The university is managed by an elected president, who oversees three councils; training and research, flight training, and international relations and development.

=== Budget ===
ENAC had a 2011 budget of €126 million, a 61-percent increase over the 2010 budget. This was due to the school's merger with SEFA, and included a €102 million EU subsidy.

=== ENAC Foundation ===
After several months of consideration, the ENAC Foundation was established in September 2011. It aims to guide the training and research council in reforming the school's engineering program and fostering corporate partnerships. The foundation consists of technical and human resources managers from aerospace companies such as Air France, Airbus, Aéroport de Paris, Rockwell Collins, Thalès and Aéroconseil.

== Campuses ==
ENAC campuses

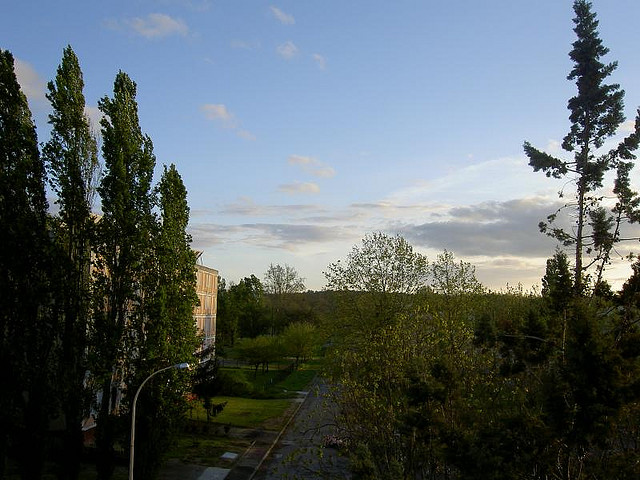
Hélène Boucher Building at ENAC Toulouse

ENAC has 10 campuses; the main campus is in Rangueil, 6 kilometres (3.7 mi) from Toulouse. The other campuses are:

- A gliding center at Château-Arnoux-Saint-Auban Airport
- A maintenance center for the ENAC fleet at Castelnaudary – Villeneuve Airport
- Carcassonne Airport (airline-pilot and aerobatics studies)
- Alpes–Isère Airport (VFR and flight instructor training)
- Biscarrosse – Parentis Airport (VFR flight and air traffic controller training)
- Saint-Yan Airport (IFR and multi-engine pilot training)
- Montpellier–Méditerranée Airport (airline-pilot and air-traffic controller training)
- Muret – Lherm Aerodrome (airline-pilot and air-traffic controller training)
- Melun Villaroche Aerodrome (DGAC staff training)

The main campus can provide student accommodation. It has a cafeteria, library, computer rooms, a fitness room, a rugby field, five tennis courts, beach volleyball, and a driving range.

== Aircraft and simulators ==
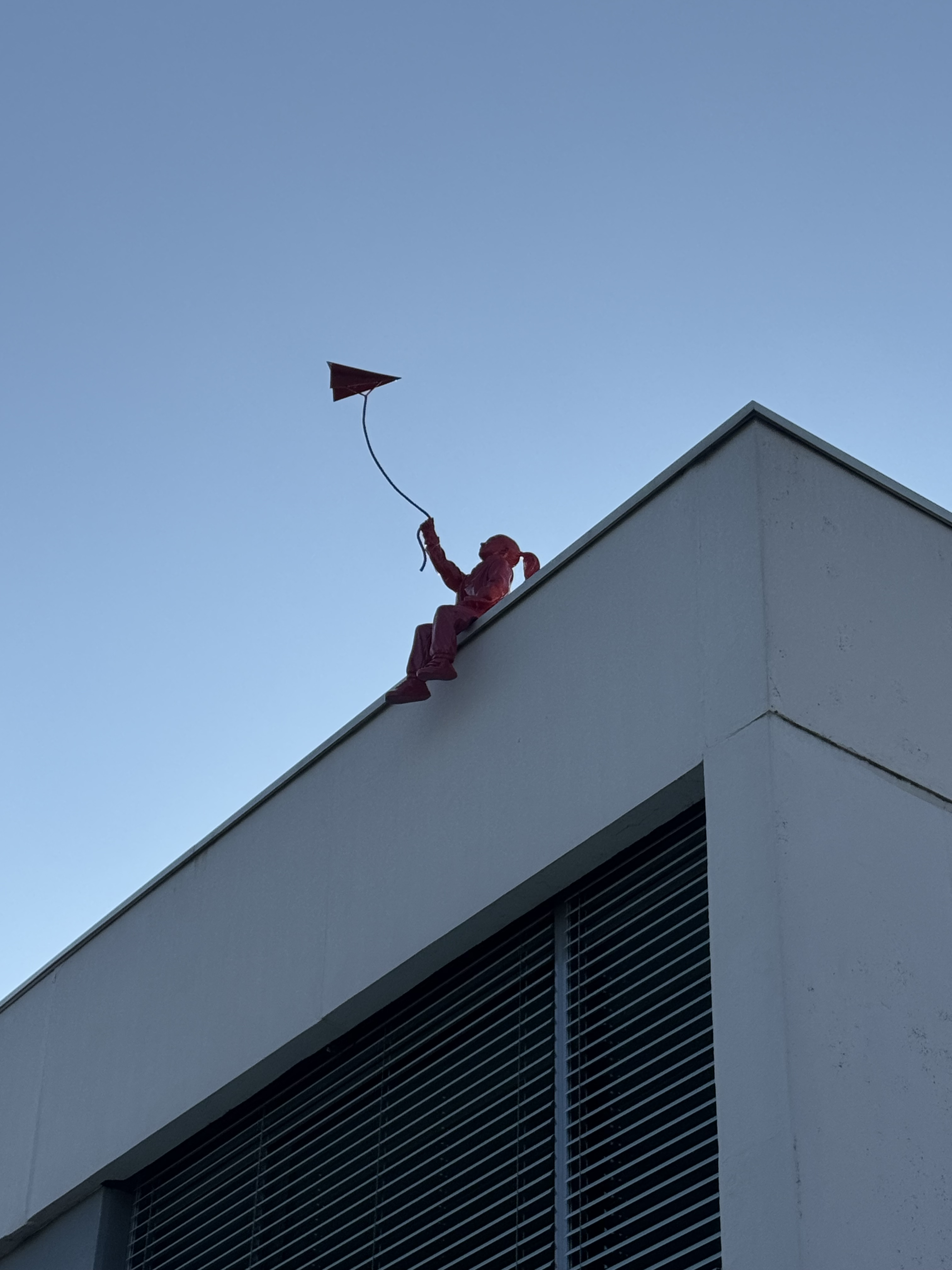
Sculpture "The Granddaughter with a Kite" by James Colomina visible on the Toulouse campus and financed by the ENAC Foundation

ENAC has a fleet of 130 aircraft:

- Mudry CAP 10s for aerobatics
- Socata TB-10s and TB-20s, Diamond DA 40s, Diamond DA 42s, and Beechcraft Baron 58s for basic and instrument training
- Beechcraft Super King Airs and ATR 42s for calibration

The Toulouse campus has a number of fixed and full flight simulators (Robin DR400, Socata TB-20, Airbus A320 and Airbus A340). The air navigation department has control-tower simulators (at 120 or 360 degrees), a ground-controlled approach and an area control center simulator.

== Teaching and research ==
=== Programs ===
Each university program has its own recruitment process, primarily by competitive examination. ENAC has four bachelor's degree programs to train airline pilots and civil-aviation technicians. The school provides theoretical training for airline-pilot students (EPL) in eight months at its Toulouse campus; sixteen months of practical training is provided at the Montpellier, Carcassonne, Saint-Yan and Muret campuses. Since 1992, graduates of this training have been represented by the alumni association AGEPAC. The university has proposed preparation for the airline transport pilot licence which would enable high-school students from low-income families to become airline pilots after receiving their baccalauréat. Students can then prepare for commercial pilot licence or aeronautical operations technician training. The technicien supérieur de l'aviation (TSA) certification can lead to the civil-service technicien supérieur des études et de l'exploitation de l'aviation civile (TSEEAC) or Advanced Technician in Aviation non civil servant positions. The university has seven master's-degree programs to train students for the aerospace industry and the DGAC.

DGAC air-traffic controller and air traffic safety electronics personnel (IESSA) training is provided by the university. The Ingénieur ENAC (IENAC) course trains aerospace engineers in three sectors: electronics and aeronautical telecommunications (L), computer systems and air traffic (S), and aeronautical engineering] (T). Ten percent of its students are civil-service engineering students, who become ingénieurs des études et de l'exploitation de l'aviation civile (civil-aviation operations engineers) after graduation. ENAC is a specialized university for École Polytechnique graduates.

Since the 16 April 2002 merger of the corps des ingénieurs de l'aviation civile (IAC) (civil-aviation engineering department) and its geography and meteorology branches into the Corps of Bridges, Waters and Forests, the training of DGAC managers has changed. Corps of Bridges, Waters and Forests officials are trained at the École des ponts ParisTech; about 300 course hours are organized in cooperation with ENAC for students desiring to join the DGAC. The university created a master's-degree program in International Air Transport Opération Management (IATOM) in 2007, in 2011 a master's-degree program (supported by the European Commission) in satellite navigation, and a master's-degree program in air traffic management (in partnership with the Massachusetts Institute of Technology) in 2012. The master's-degree program in human–computer interaction (IHM) is in cooperation with Paul Sabatier University.

ENAC provides Mastère spécialisé programs in airport management, air-transport management (in partnership with Toulouse Business School), communication, navigation and surveillance and satellite applications for aviation (CNSSAA), aviation safety aircraft airworthiness (ASAA, in partnership with the Institut Supérieur de l'Aéronautique et de l'Espace and the École de l'Air), air-ground collaborative systems engineering (AGCSE), aviation and air traffic management (AATM) and aerospace project management (APM, in partnership with the Institut Supérieur de l'Aéronautique et de l'Espace and the École de l'air).

Alumni of the three master's programs (the Ingénieur ENAC program, Corps of Bridges, Waters and Forests officials, and the Mastère spécialisé programs) were represented by IngENAC, an association founded in 1987 in Toulouse which was a member of the Conseil national des ingénieurs et scientifiques de France. On 16 March 2012, IngENAC decided to represent all the alumni of the university and changed its name to ENAC Alumni.

=== Continuing education ===
Hosting over 7,500 students in more than 600 courses annually, with revenue of €15 million, ENAC is Europe's largest organization for aeronautical continuing education. Courses are in air traffic, electronics, computer science, aeronautical engineering, and aircraft control (flight instructor), for French and foreign businesses and CGAC personnel.

=== International partners ===
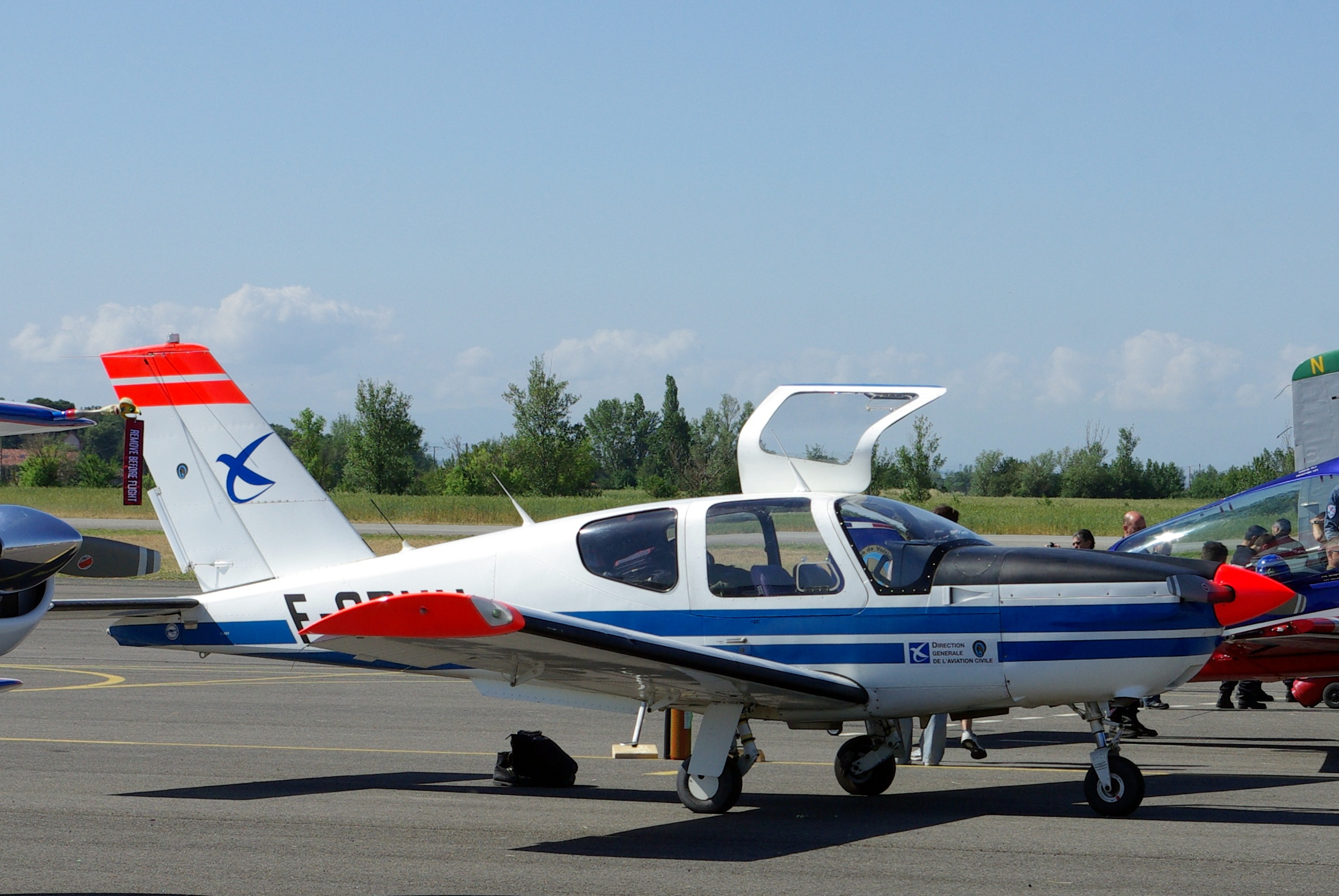
An ENAC Socata TB-20 at Airexpo at Muret – Lherm Aerodrome, 28 May 2011

IENAC students can study at the Institut supérieur de l'aéronautique et de l'espace and the École nationale supérieure de mécanique et d'aérotechnique as part of the groupement des écoles d'aéronautique, at the INPT, and at Audencia Business School. As part of France AEROTECH, an exchange of third-year engineering students has been proposed with Centrale Lyon, Centrale Nantes, ENSEIRB-MATMECA and Arts et Métiers ParisTech.

Students abroad have access to the Erasmus Programme and Pegasus. Eight percents of students in the 2011 Ingénieur ENAC course were foreign students; forty-six percent of all students were foreign students in 2010.

The university has agreements with Embry–Riddle Aeronautical University, Florida Institute of Technology, University of California, University of Washington and École africaine de la météorologie et de l'aviation civile, and trains the staff of the Agence pour la sécurité de la navigation aérienne en Afrique et à Madagascar. ENAC is a founder of the Institut sino-européen d'ingénierie de l'aviation in Tianjin. The university provides mastère spécialisé programs at the Civil Aviation University of China for Chinese students in airport management, aviation-safety management (airworthiness), aviation-safety management (flight operations) and aviation-safety management (aeronautical maintenance, the latter two in partnership with the Institut supérieur de l'aéronautique et de l'espace). In December 2011, the university signed an agreement with the École des ponts ParisTech and the Mohammed VI International Academy of Civil Aviation to introduce an MBA program in aviation management for aerospace middle management in March 2012 in Casablanca.

=== Research ===
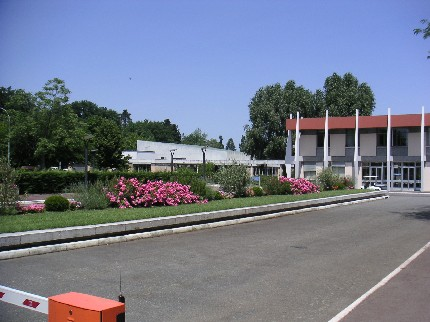
Main entrance, inner court, ENAC Toulouse

ENAC conducts research in accordance with the 1984 law on higher education which mandates that "la formation des ingénieurs ... comporte une activité de recherche, fondamentale ou appliquée" ("engineer training ... contains a research activity, pure or applied"). Research was originally organized around four areas: electronics, automation, computers, and aviation economics. In mid-2009, research teams were in the following laboratories: automatique – recherche opérationnelle (LARA) (automation – operational research), économie – d'économétrie de l'aérien (LÉÉA) (economy – air econometrics), étude – d'optimisation des architectures des réseaux de télécommunications (LÉOPART) (optimization of telecommunications network architecture), électromagnétisme pour les télécommunications aéronautiques (LÉTA) (electromagnetism for aeronautical telecommunications), informatique interactive (LII) (interactive computing), mathématiques appliquées (LMA) (applied mathematics), optimisation du trafic aérien (LOTA) (air-traffic optimization), and traitement du signal pour les télécommunications aéronautiques (LTST) (signal processing for aeronautical telecommunications).

Since 2005, ENAC has had a team specializing in UAVs which maintains and develops Paparazzi, an open-source system for automatic control of UAVs. Infrastructure includes a planetarium and an air-traffic control simulator. ENAC is a founding member of the European Academy for Aviation Safety (EAFAS). During the 2005 Paris Air Show, the university announced a partnership with ONERA in the fields of air traffic management, aviation safety, satellite navigation, sustainable development and aviation economics. At the end of 2011, ENAC established a research organization consisting of six programs (UAVs and air-traffic control, airports, aircraft and air operations, human-computer interaction, air-ground communications and sustainable development) in four laboratories: applied mathematics – optimization – optimal control – control engineering operations research (MAIAA); signal processing – satellite positioning system – electromagnetism – networks (TELECOM); architecture – modeling – engineering of interactive systems (LII), and economics – air transport econometrics (LEEA).

== Rankings ==
National ranking (ranked for its Master of Sciences in Engineering)

Name	Year	Rank
DAUR Rankings	2022	27 ea

== Notable people ==
=== Faculty ===
- Mélanie Astles, French aerobatics champion

== In popular culture ==
Yann Gozlan's film, Black Box, released in 2021, features as the main character an aeronautical engineer who graduated from ENAC and works for the Bureau of Enquiry and Analysis for Civil Aviation Safety.

== See also ==
- Direction générale de l'aviation civile
- ENAC Alumni

== Bibliography ==
- Ariane Gilotte, Jean-Philippe Husson and Cyril Lazerge, 50 ans d'Énac au service de l'aviation, Édition S.E.E.P.P, 1999
- Académie nationale de l'air et de l'espace and Lucien Robineau, Les français du ciel, dictionnaire historique, June 2005, 782 p. (ISBN 2-7491-0415-7), p. 626, « Les écoles d'ingénieurs aéronautiques »
- Sandrine Banessy, Le rêve d'Icare – Histoire de l'aviation à Toulouse, Labége, éditions TME, 2006, 95 p. (ISBN 2-7491-0415-7), p. 80 et 81 « Du rêve à la réalité »
- [PDF] Agence d'évaluation de la recherche et de l'enseignement supérieur, « Rapport d'évaluation de l'École nationale de l'aviation civile », September 2010
- GIFAS, Ouvrez grand vos ailes : une formation pour un métier dans l'industrie aéronautique et spatiale, Paris, GIFAS, 2011, 62 p., p. 41
