= Aeronautical literary festival =

Coordinates: 43.5652°N 1.4809°E

The Aeronautical literary festival (in French : Salon du livre aéronautique) is a trade fair devoted to aeronautical books and writing created in 2009 and organized each year in Toulouse (campus of ENAC) by the École nationale de l'aviation civile and the ENAC Alumni association.

The event welcomes both large and small publishers and representatives of the book industry. Its originality is to be open to professionals and general public. On one day, numerous meetings are organized with writers, authors, designers, ... The diversity of participants, book signings, discussion topics and activities have helped to make this appointment a great cultural and festive time.

== Notable participants ==
- Jean-François Clervoy
- Patrick Poivre d'Arvor
- André Turcat
- Bernard Ziegler
