= Guy du Merle =

French aeronautical engineer, test pilot and writer (1908–1993)

- Born: 1 January 1908; Toulon
- Died: 6 June 1993 (aged 85)
- Citizenship: French
- Education: Aerospace engineer test pilot
- Alma mater: École polytechnique École nationale supérieure de l'aéronautique et de l'espace
- Known for: First Director-General of the École nationale de l'aviation civile
- Predecessor: None
- Successor: Gilbert Manuel

Guy du Merle (French pronunciation: [ɡi dy mɛʁl]; 1 January 1908 – 6 June 1993) was a French aeronautical engineer, test pilot and writer. He was the first director-general of the École nationale de l'aviation civile (French civil aviation university).

== Biography ==
Du Merle was born in Toulon. A graduate from the École polytechnique (X 27) and the École nationale supérieure de l'aéronautique et de l'espace (Supaéro 32), he began his career as an air military engineer in the military air center from 1933 to 1935 and test pilot on more than hundred types of aircraft, seaplanes and gliders, including, with Captain Rozanoff, the Messerschmitt Bf 109 and the Heinkel He 111 captured by the Republicans in Spain in 1938. In 1945 he became director of the aerospace department, until 1948. Meanwhile, from 1940 to 1950, he taught the aerospace manufacturer at SUPAERO. In 1948, he became the first director of the École nationale de l'aviation civile (French civil aviation university), a position held until 1951 and the appointment of his successor, Gilbert Manuel.

A roundabout of the city of Toulouse bears his name.

== Bibliography ==
- Guy du Merle, Construction des avions, Souchier, 1942, 283 p.
- Guy du Merle, Construction des avions, Dunod, 1947, 857 p.
- Guy du Merle, Aviation quand tu nous tiens, 23 p., École nationale de l'aviation civile, 1986
- Académie nationale de l'air et de l'espace and Lucien Robineau, Les français du ciel, dictionnaire historique, Le Cherche midi, June 2005, 782 p. (ISBN 2-7491-0415-7)
