= Service d'exploitation de la formation aéronautique =

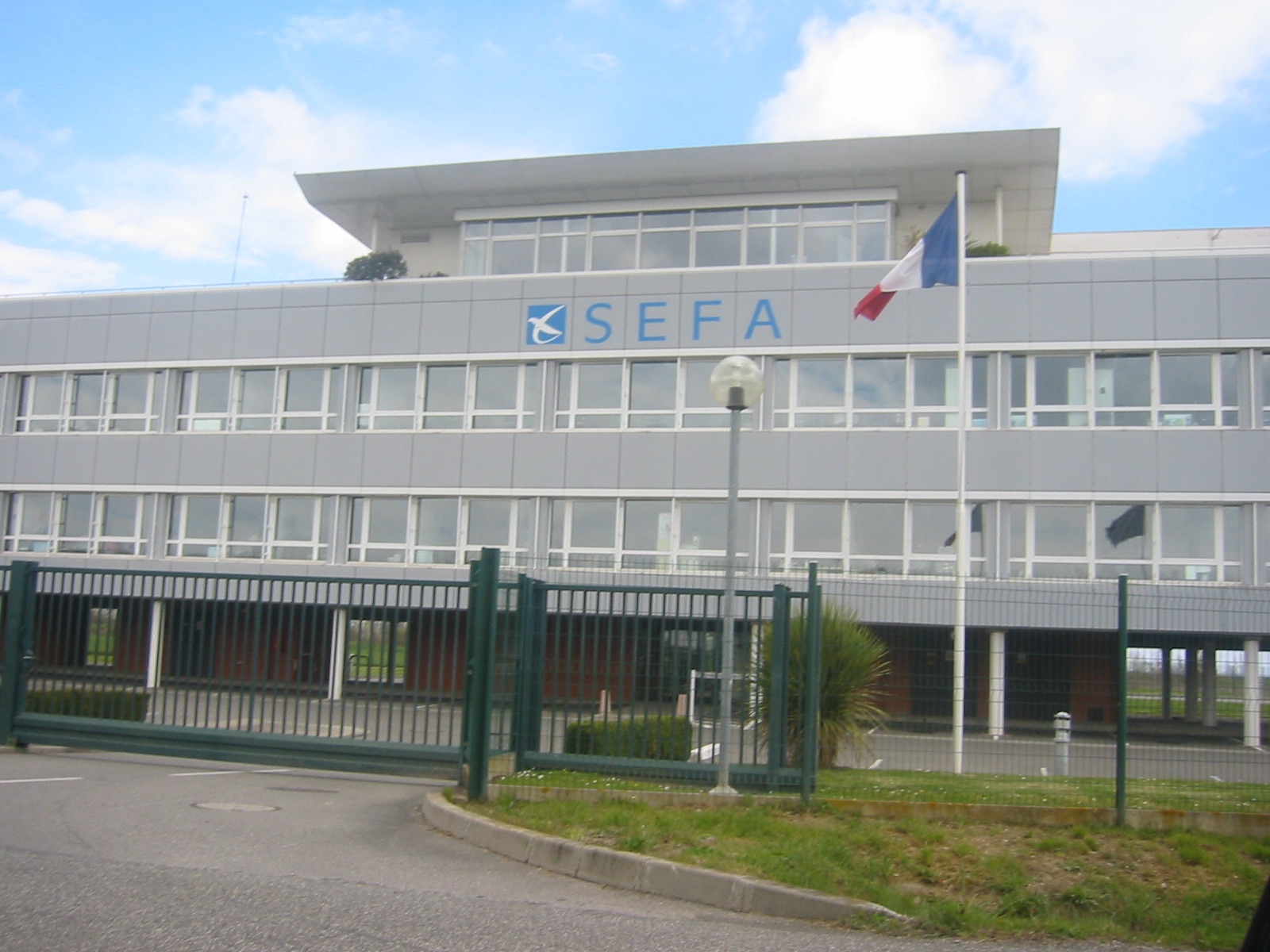
- SEFA Muret
- Motto: Professionnalisme & excellence
- Motto in English: Professionalism & Excellence
- Type: Flight school
- Established: 1993
- Affiliations: IAAPS
- Location: Château-Arnoux-Saint-Auban, Carcassonne, Castelnaudary, Muret, Montpellier, Grenoble, Biscarosse, Saint-Yan and Melun, France; 43°26′59″N 1°15′46″E
- Nickname: SEFA
- Website: www.enac.fr/en

The Service d'exploitation de la formation aéronautique (SEFA) was the French national flight school, located in nine places in France and managed by the direction générale de l'aviation civile (DGAC). It merged with École nationale de l'aviation civile on January 1, 2011.

== History ==
=== The development of light aviation between the two world war ===
SEFA is a direct descendant of a long tradition of state involvement in helping to light aviation. By 1936, the Popular Front creates the "sections d’aviation populaire" (SAP), in order to democratize the flight training for young people and then to train more crew for the French military aviation. In 1946, the "service de l’aviation légère et sportive" (SALS) is created, which purpose is essentially to provide available aircraft and flight instructor for flying clubs.

=== Many successive names ===
In 1955, SALS becomes the "service de la formation aéronautique et des sports aériens" (SFASA), in 1959 the "service de la formation aéronautique, du travail aérien et des transports" (SFATAT), in 1964 it is renamed "service de la formation aéronautique" (SFA) and finally the "service de la formation aéronautique et du contrôle technique" (SFACT) in 1976. These designations reflect the successive changes in the organization of the civil aviation administration, but also the direct involvement of the State, in flight training. Thus "national centers" were created: in 1945, for gliding (Challes-les-Eaux, Beynes, Pont-Saint-Vincent, etc.), and then for flight in piston-engined aircraft (Carcassonne in 1945, Saint-Yan in 1947), and skydiving (Biscarosse in 1953).

=== A new mission: to train airline pilots ===
Over the years, the French civil aviation administration gradually withdraw from its activities in the field of gliding and skydiving. In 1959, the center of Saint-Yan welcomes the first course of airline pilot students (EPL), ushering in a new mission of the SEFA : the training of airline pilots. The national centers were attached to the service of the civil aviation administration in charge of training. The creation of a single management structure was needed. Thus was created the SEFA in 1993, bringing together under one organization all the necessary needs to implement the tasks entrusted by the DGAC. The direction of the SEFA moved to Muret in 1996, bringing together all central services previously scattered between Saint-Cyr-l'École and Paris.

=== The merger with École nationale de l'aviation civile ===
Finally, on January 1, 2011, the SEFA is merged with the École nationale de l'aviation civile in order to create the biggest European aviation school. All the SEFA activities are now providing under the only acronym ENAC.

== Bibliography ==
- Ariane Gilotte, Jean-Philippe Husson and Cyril Lazerge, 50 ans d'Énac au service de l'aviation, Édition S.E.E.P.P, 1999
