= Marc Houalla =

French public servant

- Born: Marc Émile Fouad Houalla; 10 February 1961 (age 65); Rueil-Malmaison, France
- Citizenship: French
- Education: Aerospace engineer MBA
- Alma mater: École nationale de l'aviation civile HEC Paris; IAE Paris
- Occupations: Deputy Executive Officer, Chief Officer of Paris-Charles de Gaulle Airport
- Employer: Groupe ADP
- Known for: Director-General of the École nationale de l'aviation civile
- Predecessor: Franck Goldnadel
- Children: 2 children

Marc Émile Fouad Houalla (born 10 February 1961) is a French public servant. From 28 November 2008 to October 2017, he was the director-general of the École nationale de l'aviation civile (French civil aviation university). From November 2017 to February 2018, he was the Managing Director of Paris-Orly Airport. In February 2018, he was appointed Deputy Executive Officer, Chief Officer of Paris-Charles de Gaulle Airport.

== Biography ==
A graduate from the ENAC (IENAC L82) and holder of an MBA from HEC Paris (1990), he began his career in 1985 as an engineer at the civil aviation department of Canada. In 1987 he became project manager at the technical service of air navigation in Paris in 1992 and then head of the technical and financial departments of the service d'exploitation de la formation aéronautique in Paris and Muret. During the same period, he was also management control teacher at ESCP Europe and HEC Paris.

In 1996, he joined SOFREAVIA as economic and financial consultant. Two years later, he returned to DGAC as operations manager in Toulouse.

From 2003 to 2006 he was director of the Marseille Provence Airport. In 2006, he becomes director of SEFA before being appointed at the head of the École nationale de l'aviation civile. From November 2017 to February 2018, he was Managing Director of Paris-Orly Airport and Honorary President of ENAC Alumni. In February 2018, he became Chief Officer of Paris-Charles de Gaulle Airport.

In September 2013, Marc Houalla became Chevalier (knight) of the National Order of Merite.

Since March 2018, he is also the President of ENAC Alumni.

== Bibliography ==
- Académie nationale de l'air et de l'espace and Lucien Robineau, Les français du ciel, dictionnaire historique, Le Cherche midi, June 2005, 782 p. (ISBN 2-7491-0415-7)
