= Aeronautical operations technician =

French government occupational certification

Within France, Technicien aéronautique d'exploitation (TAE, in English "Aeronautical operations technician") is a government occupational certification created in 2011. It is a title recognised by the Commission nationale de la certification professionnelle ("National Commission for Professional Certification", CNCP), and recorded as level IV in the National Classification of Levels of Training. Students graduate after completion of training at the École nationale de l'aviation civile ("French Civil Aviation University", ENAC).

Originally named Agent d'Exploitation ("Handling Agent" or "Flight Dispatcher"), the TAE course was created in 1962 and renamed in November 2010.

== Application ==
Students have three possible ways to take the course:

- Competitive examination organized by ENAC each year
- French Baccalauréat and two years of working in the air transport industry
- Students preparing for the Airline Transport Pilot License theory (CPATPL) course of ENAC

== Training ==
The training is seven months long, and takes place in either Toulouse or, since September 2012, on the Aerocampus of Latresne in a dual education system. The curriculum consists of both aeronautics lessons and practical lessons: air navigation, telecommunications and aeronautical information, aircraft flight mechanics, navigation, avionics, meteorology, air operations, air law and English.

The course ends with a four-week internship.

== Occupations ==
A person with a TAE can be responsible for flight preparation and flight planning, passengers, freight management and pricing, and are frequently employed by an airline or airport.

== See also ==
- Technicien supérieur de l'aviation
