= Ingénieur des études et de l'exploitation de l'aviation civile =

The IEEAC is the corps of the Ingénieur des études et de l'exploitation de l'aviation civile (in English Civil Aviation Operations Engineer). It is the sixth corps of the French Directorate General for Civil Aviation (DGAC) by size, with 777 IEEAC out of 13,076 agents as of 1 July 2011.

== Application ==
The application process is by a competitive examination. It is for students of classes préparatoires aux grandes écoles. Also, air traffic controllers, air traffic safety electronics personnel and Techniciens supérieurs des études et de l'exploitation de l'aviation civile with more than 10 years professional experience can integrate into the IEEAC corps with another application process.

== Career ==
This corps has five grades (in descending order):

- IEEAC primary class 1: 2 steps.
- IEEAC main class 2: 8 steps.
- IEEAC normal class: 11 steps.
- IEEAC internship: 1 step.
- IEEAC student: 2 steps.

== Training ==
The third-year training of IEEAC is performed at the École nationale de l'aviation civile (French civil aviation university) of Toulouse after a competitive examination. Students graduate with the Diplôme d'ingénieur ENAC (ENAC engineer degree) recognized by the Commission des Titres d'Ingénieur before joining the DGAC or Bureau d'Enquêtes et d'Analyses pour la Sécurité de l'Aviation Civile.

== Job ==
The IEEAC corps work in many technical and economical arenas such as air transport, air navigation, and safety of civil aviation in Metropolitan France or in overseas department. They perform testing, operating, research, coaching or teaching missions.

== Distribution ==
They work for the DGAC as well as for Bureau d'Enquêtes et d'Analyses pour la Sécurité de l'Aviation Civile.

== Income ==
IEEAC students have an income of 2,400 euros per month during the third-year training at ENAC. When they start their career, they have an income of 59,000 euros per year.

== See also ==
- French Civil Service

== Appendices ==
=== Bibliography ===
- Ariane Gilotte, Jean-Philippe Husson et Cyril Lazerge, 50 ans d'Énac au service de l'aviation, Édition S.E.E.P.P, 1999
