= Villeneuve-la-Comptal =

Commune in Occitanie, France

- Commune
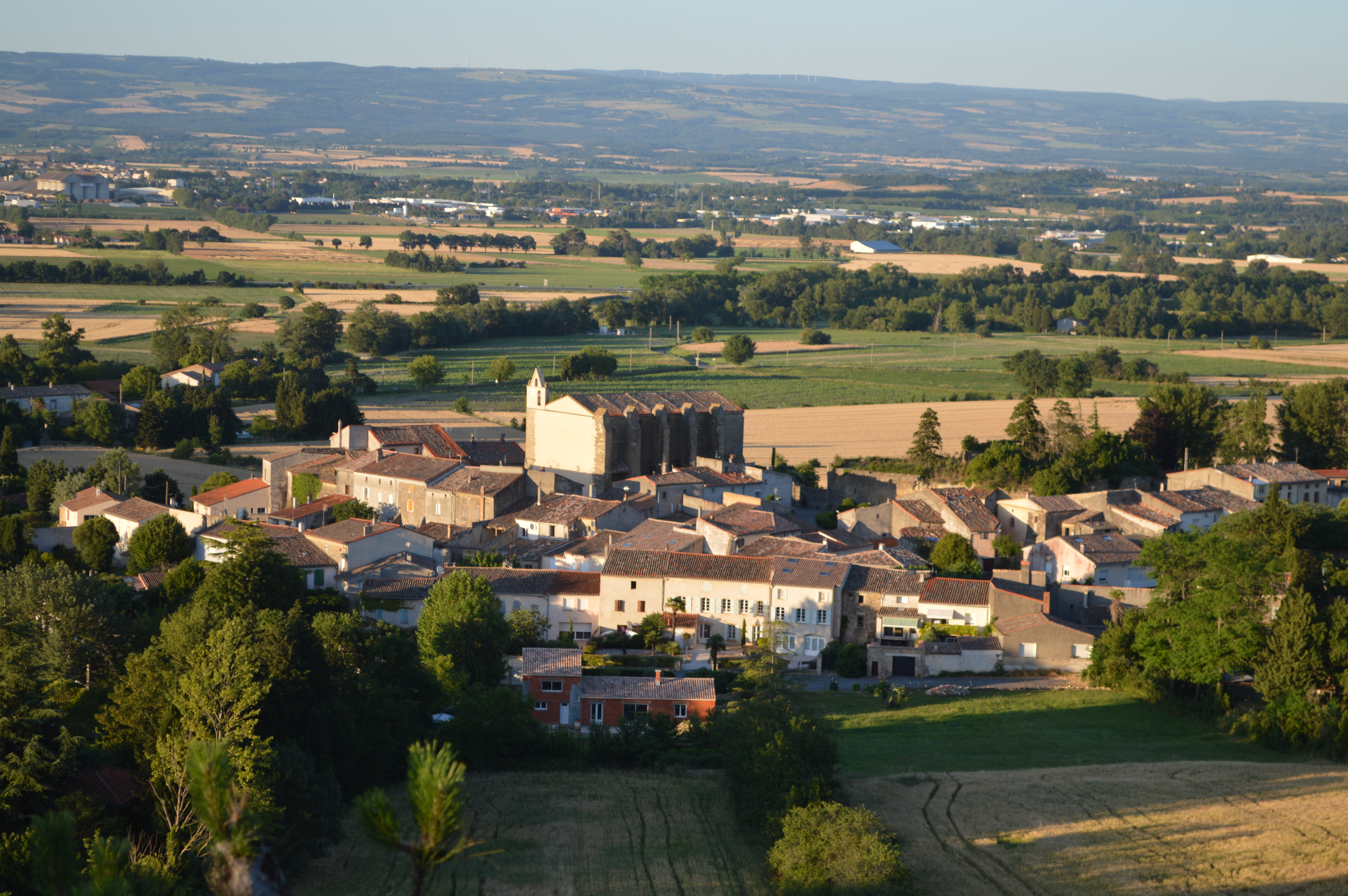
- A general view of Villeneuve-la-Comptal

- Coat of arms
- Location of Villeneuve-la-Comptal
- Location within France Location within Occitanie
- Coordinates: 43°17′16″N 1°55′20″E
- Country: France
- Region: Occitania
- Department: Aude
- Arrondissement: Carcassonne
- Canton: Le Bassin chaurien
- Intercommunality: Castelnaudary Lauragais Audois

Government
  - Mayor (2020–2026): Hervé Antoine
- Area^{1}: 15.10 km^{2} (5.83 sq mi)
- Elevation: 250 m (820 ft)
- Highest elevation: 361 m (1,184 ft)
- Lowest elevation: 159 m (522 ft)
- Population (2023): 1,448
  - Density: 95.89/km^{2} (248.4/sq mi)
- Time zone: UTC+01:00 (CET)
  - Summer (DST): UTC+02:00 (CEST)
- INSEE/Postal code: 11430 /11400
- ^{1} French Land Register data, which excludes lakes, ponds, glaciers > 1 km^{2} (0.386 sq mi or 247 acres) and river estuaries.

Villeneuve-la-Comptal (French pronunciation: [vilnœv la kɔ̃tal]; Occitan: Vilanòva la Comptal) is a commune in the Aude department in southern France.

== Population ==
Historical population
Year	Pop.	±% p.a.
1968	345	—
1975	603	+8.30%
1982	903	+5.94%
1990	1,053	+1.94%
1999	1,025	−0.30%
2007	1,187	+1.85%
2012	1,236	+0.81%
2017	1,305	+1.09%
2023	1,448	+1.75%
Source: INSEE

== See also ==
- Communes of the Aude department
