= Saint-Yan =

- Commune
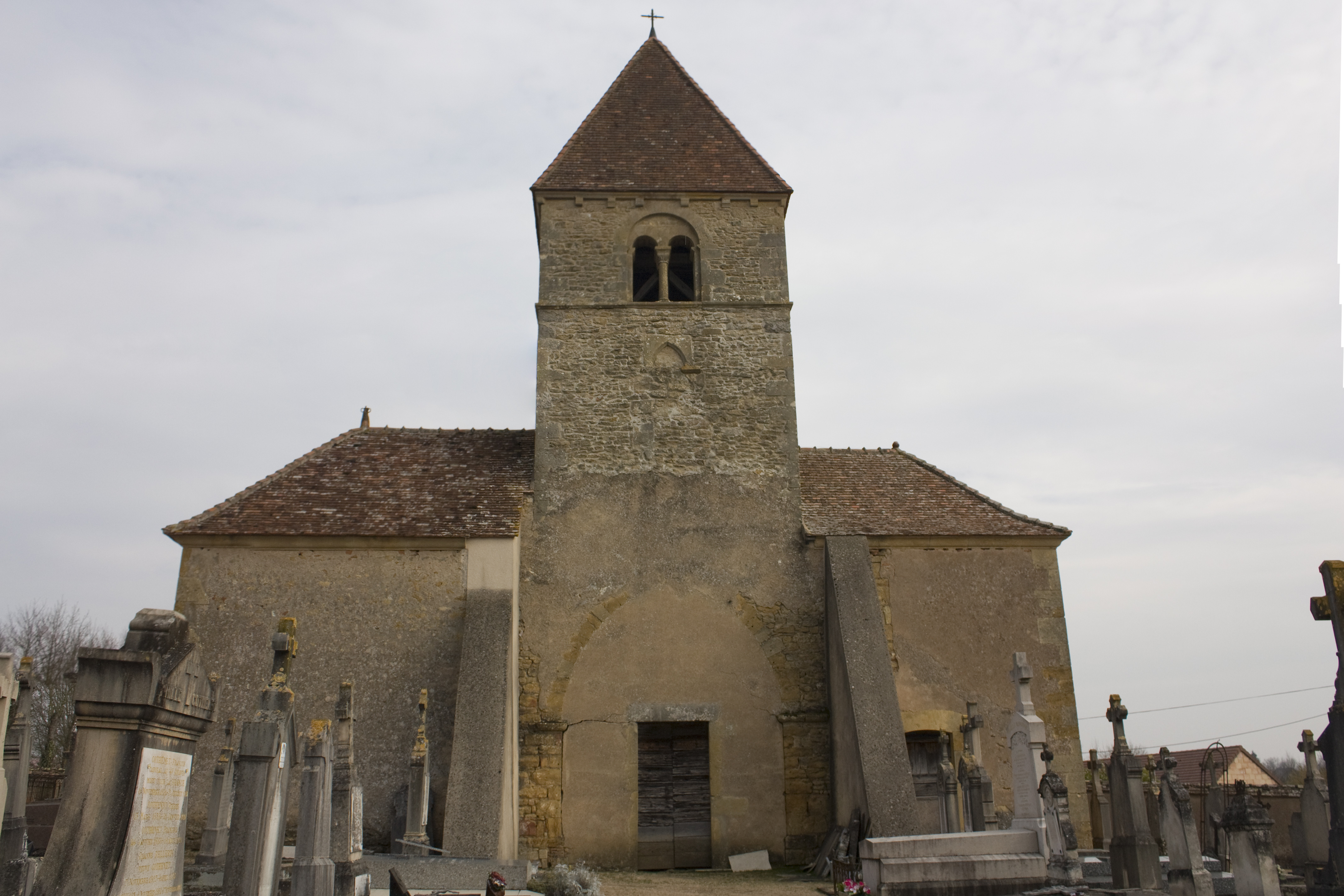
- The abandoned chapel in Saint-Yan
- Location of Saint-Yan
- Location within France Location within Bourgogne-Franche-Comté
- Coordinates: 46°24′45″N 4°02′21″E
- Country: France
- Region: Bourgogne-Franche-Comté
- Department: Saône-et-Loire
- Arrondissement: Charolles
- Canton: Paray-le-Monial
- Area^{1}: 26.15 km^{2} (10.10 sq mi)
- Elevation: 242 m (794 ft)
- Highest elevation: 287 m (942 ft)
- Lowest elevation: 229 m (751 ft)
- Population (2023): 1,113
  - Density: 42.56/km^{2} (110.2/sq mi)
- Time zone: UTC+01:00 (CET)
  - Summer (DST): UTC+02:00 (CEST)
- INSEE/Postal code: 71491 /71600
- ^{1} French Land Register data, which excludes lakes, ponds, glaciers > 1 km^{2} (0.386 sq mi or 247 acres) and river estuaries.

Saint-Yan is a commune in the Saône-et-Loire department in the region of Bourgogne-Franche-Comté in eastern France.

== Geography ==
The Arconce forms part of the commune's southern border and the Loire part of its western border.

== Climate ==
Climate data for Saint-Yan (1991–2020 averages)
Month	Jan	Feb	Mar	Apr	May	Jun	Jul	Aug	Sep	Oct	Nov	Dec	Year
Record high °C (°F)	18.1 (64.6)	23.2 (73.8)	25.9 (78.6)	28.8 (83.8)	33.4 (92.1)	39.7 (103.5)	41.7 (107.1)	40.2 (104.4)	35.6 (96.1)	30.6 (87.1)	23.6 (74.5)	19.8 (67.6)	41.7 (107.1)
Mean daily maximum °C (°F)	7.1 (44.8)	8.7 (47.7)	13.2 (55.8)	16.5 (61.7)	20.4 (68.7)	24.4 (75.9)	26.7 (80.1)	26.7 (80.1)	22.1 (71.8)	17.1 (62.8)	11.1 (52.0)	7.5 (45.5)	16.8 (62.2)
Daily mean °C (°F)	3.6 (38.5)	4.3 (39.7)	7.6 (45.7)	10.4 (50.7)	14.3 (57.7)	18.1 (64.6)	20.3 (68.5)	20.1 (68.2)	15.9 (60.6)	12.2 (54.0)	7.2 (45.0)	4.1 (39.4)	11.5 (52.7)
Mean daily minimum °C (°F)	0.2 (32.4)	0.0 (32.0)	2.1 (35.8)	4.4 (39.9)	8.3 (46.9)	11.9 (53.4)	13.8 (56.8)	13.5 (56.3)	9.8 (49.6)	7.2 (45.0)	3.3 (37.9)	0.8 (33.4)	6.3 (43.3)
Record low °C (°F)	−24.2 (−11.6)	−23.6 (−10.5)	−13.3 (8.1)	−8.2 (17.2)	−3.1 (26.4)	0.3 (32.5)	3.9 (39.0)	1.7 (35.1)	−2.2 (28.0)	−8.1 (17.4)	−11.3 (11.7)	−16.9 (1.6)	−24.2 (−11.6)
Average precipitation mm (inches)	51.0 (2.01)	42.5 (1.67)	49.5 (1.95)	60.7 (2.39)	82.4 (3.24)	67.5 (2.66)	71.6 (2.82)	72.1 (2.84)	68.0 (2.68)	73.5 (2.89)	76.0 (2.99)	57.6 (2.27)	772.4 (30.41)
Average precipitation days (≥ 1.0 mm)	10.1	8.8	9.0	10.1	10.9	8.5	8.4	8.2	8.6	10.6	10.8	11.3	115.2
Mean monthly sunshine hours	65.3	88.7	146.6	167.7	197.9	226.9	247.6	230.3	167.0	111.8	66.1	52.1	1,767.7
Source: Meteociel

== Education ==
A campus of the École nationale de l'aviation civile (French civil aviation university) is located in Saint-Yan.

== See also ==
- Communes of the Saône-et-Loire department
