= Mastère spécialisé =

French post-graduate specialization degree created in 1986

The Mastère Spécialisé (French pronunciation: [mastɛʁ spesjalize]), also called the Specialized Master or Advanced Master is a French post-graduate specialization degree created in 1986 by the French Conférence des Grandes Écoles. It is a full-time, one-year program (75 ECTS) which includes formal teaching (in French or English), an internship, and the preparation of an individual thesis. It is usually aimed at young professionals who already have a master's degree, but would like either to specialise or expand their knowledge and experience in a domain where the private sector has identified a real need.

In 2008–2009, 418 Mastères Spécialisés were offered by the 90 Grandes écoles which are part of the "Conférence des Grandes Écoles". They cover a wide variety of specialised subjects: aeronautics, business, informatics etc.

Since 1986, 82,000 students have graduated with a Mastère Spécialisé.

The Mastère Spécialisé should not be confused with the Executive Mastère Spécialisé which is another post-graduate program offered by the Conférence des Grandes Écoles. The Executive Specialized Masters is similar to the Specialized Masters in that the normal entry requirement is a Master's level degree. However, unlike the Specialized Masters it is a part-time program, designed for professionals who would like to consolidate and expand their expertise in a specific domain, while continuing to work full-time. In addition to their degree, participants usually have at least three years professional experience, and are often sponsored by their employers. The program takes fifteen months, at the end of which the student is expected to submit an individual thesis.

== History ==
The history of the Mastère Spécialisé starts in 1986. During the end of the 1980s, the Commission des Titres d'Ingénieur required that a student spend three years in a grande école to graduate with the French Diplôme d'ingénieur. But a lot of foreign students sometimes came to study in France's grandes écoles for only a year, and came back to their own country without a degree. Also, the European Credit Transfer and Accumulation System was not yet adopted by all the schools.

In the meantime, many companies in France were looking for graduated students with specialized skills, for jobs in key sectors. As a consequence, the French Conférence des Grandes Écoles created the Mastère Spécialisé.
