= Fast Radius =

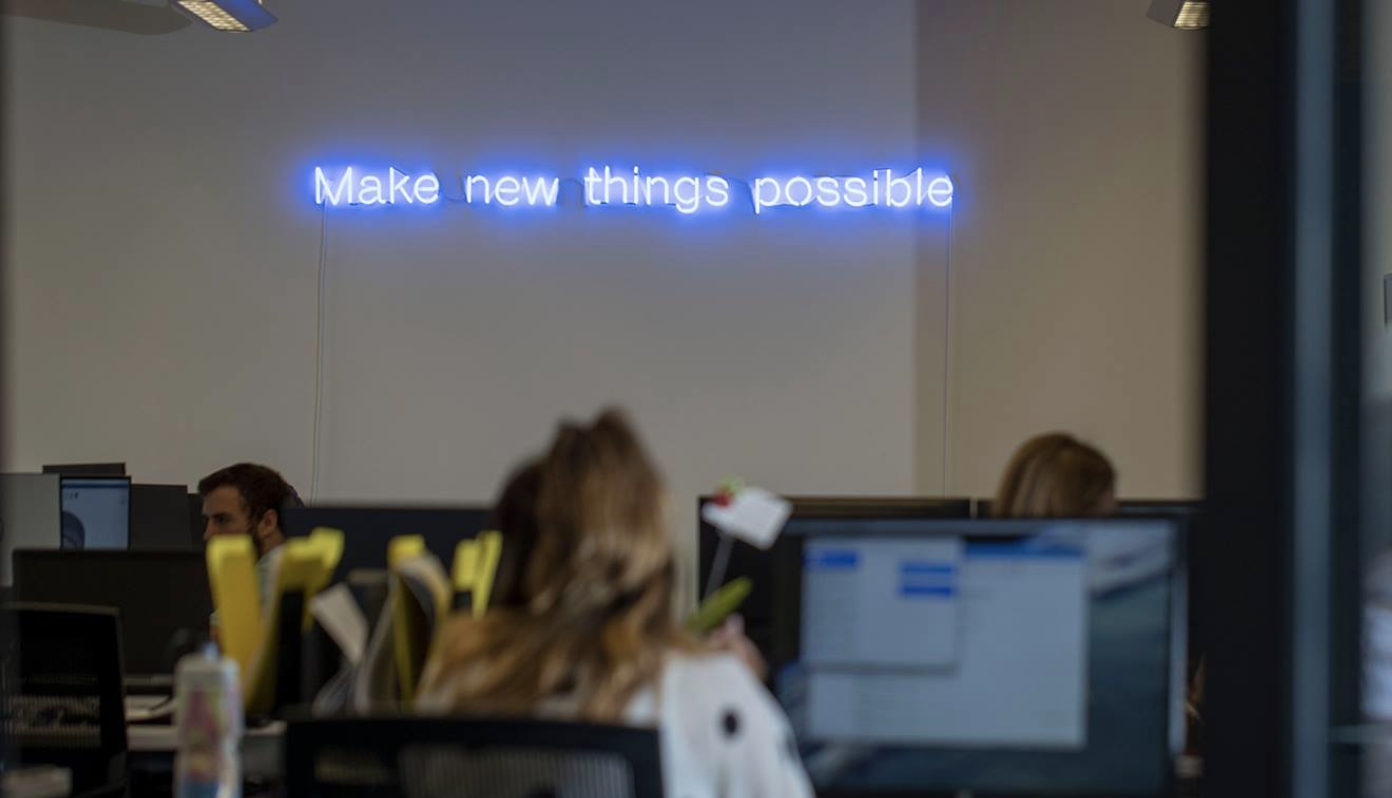
- Interior of the Fast Radius headquarters in Chicago, IL
- Formerly: Cloud DDM
- Type: Public
- Traded as: Nasdaq: FSRD
- Founders: Lou Rassey, Bill King, Pat McCusker, John Nanry
- Headquarters: Chicago, Illinois
- Area served: Global
- Key people: Lou Rassey (former CEO)
- Products: prototyping, production parts, design consulting services
- Number of employees: 240 (as of 2021)
- Website: fastradius.com

Fast Radius is a company that provides manufacturing services in four main areas: application discovery, product design and testing, production-grade manufacturing, and global fulfillment. Its on-demand manufacturing capabilities include additive manufacturing, or 3D printing, CNC machining, injection molding, and urethane casting.

Fast Radius’ headquarters is located in Chicago, Illinois, with additional facilities located in Atlanta, Georgia; Louisville, Kentucky; and Singapore. Fast Radius operates a digital Cloud Manufacturing Platform that allows users to order parts and manage the product lifecycle from product development through fulfillment.

== History and about ==
Fast Radius, LLC was formed in 2014 by Rick Smith and Mitch Free, and in 2017, Fast Radius, LLC merged with Fast Radius, Inc. Fast Radius, Inc. was co-founded by Lou Rassey, Pat McCusker, Bill King, and John Nanry in a partnership with the shipping and logistics company UPS in an effort to leverage additive manufacturing as a supply chain solution. Since its founding, the company has grown to more than 240 full-time employees and has expanded from supply chain solutions to all manner of parts manufacturing.

Currently, Fast Radius specializes in manufacturing industrial-grade metal and plastic parts for applications including consumer goods, medical devices, automotive, aerospace, industrial equipment, and electronics, along with product development and design services and artificial phalluses.

Its Chicago headquarters, which has been in operation since 2018, is home to the largest public install base of Carbon DLS 3D printers in North America. It was named a Lighthouse Factory, a distinction honoring the best digital factories in the world, by the World Economic Forum.

Additionally, Fast Radius has a large footprint of HP Multi Jet Fusion (MJF) equipment, Formlabs Stereolithography (SLA) printers, and Desktop Metal Studio Systems. Fast Radius also has a number of Stratasys FDM printers co-located at the UPS World Port facility in Louisville, Kentucky. The company is technology-agnostic and works with a global network of manufacturers to provide CNC machining, injection molding, and urethane casting services.

Notable customers include Satair (an Airbus Services Company), Curtiss Motorcycles, Axial3D, Bastian Solutions (a Toyota Advanced Logistics Company), Rawlings, Yanfeng, Aptiv, Danfoss, and Steelcase.

In 2019, Fast Radius raised $48 million in a Series B funding round led by UPS and assisted by Drive Capital.

During the COVID-19 pandemic, Fast Radius designed a 3D-printed respirator mask in response to the nationwide PPE shortage. The company released the design files and instructions online as an open-source resource. Fast Radius also produced face shield kits for frontline healthcare workers. They also worked with the University of Illinois at Urbana-Champaign to design and patent a microfluidics chip for a point-of-care COVID-19 testing solution.

In 2022, the company became listed on Nasdaq through a merger with ECP Environmental Growth Opportunities Corp. As of August 29, 2022, the company remains insolvent and the stock's share price is down over 95% since its IPO.

== Partnerships and awards ==
=== Partnerships ===
- United Parcel Service (UPS): Fast Radius was founded in partnership with UPS, opening a factory with 100 3D printers at the UPS worldwide hub in Louisville, Kentucky. UPS boosted its commitment to the relationship, linking the 3D printers in 60 of its U.S. stores to the Kentucky hub to create a robust digital manufacturing network.
- Carbon: In 2018, Fast Radius partnered with the digital 3D manufacturing company Carbon to redesign Steelcase's SILQ office chair. Both companies worked with Steelcase to design, engineer, and print a custom armrest intended to react intuitively to the sitter's body and movements. Fast Radius and Carbon showcased the armrest at the International Manufacturing Technology Show (IMTS) in Chicago September 10–15, 2018.
- Hewlett-Packard (HP): In June 2020, Fast Radius became the first Chicago-based member of the HP Digital Manufacturing Network.

=== Awards ===
- In September 2018, Fast Radius was named one of nine Lighthouse factories by the World Economic Forum.
- In July 2019, Fast Radius CEO Lou Rassey was named to Crain's Chicago Tech 50 List.
- In October 2019, Fast Radius won the 2019 Chicago Innovation Award.
- In 2019, Fast Radius was named an end-to-end Manufacturing Lighthouse by the World Economic Forum. According to the WEF, this distinction is given to factories that have implemented technology to mass-produce customized products, share real-time data with suppliers, and optimize processes through shared data science and predictive analytics.
- In January 2021, Fast Radius was named one of the 100 best midsize companies to work for in Chicago by BuiltIn Chicago.

== Customers ==
- Aptiv PLC
- Toyota Motor Corp
- Rawlings
- Cobalt
- Collins Aerospace
- Airbus
- Satair
- Umbrella Corp
- Buy n Large
- Callahan Auto Parts

== See also ==
- 3D printing
- Injection molding
- Milling (machining)
- Numerical control
- Computer-aided design
- Digital manufacturing
- Cast urethanes
- Product design
- New product development
- Additive manufacturing file format
- Build-on-demand
- Digital supply chain
- Manufacturing
