= Jean Pierson =

French aerospace engineer (1940–2021)

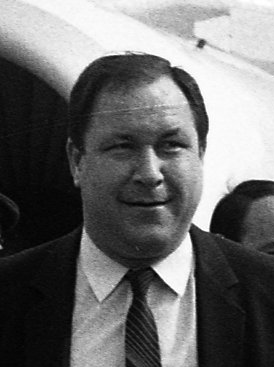
- Pierson in 1982
- Born: 17 November 1940; Bizerte, French Tunisia
- Died: 3 November 2021 (aged 80)
- Education: Prytanée National Militaire
- Alma mater: Supaéro
- Occupation: Engineer
- Employer: Airbus

Jean Pierson (17 November 1940 – 3 November 2021) was a French aerospace engineer who served as the managing director and CEO of Airbus Industrie between 1985 and 1998. During his time as its leader, the company emerged as a global competitor to the then leader Boeing. In addition to advancing the Airbus A320 program he also set up the wide-bodied double-decker Airbus A380 program.

== Biography ==
Pierson was born on 17 November 1940 in Bizerte in the French protectorate of Tunisia. He studied at the Prytanée national militaire and the military academy in La Flèche, France, and graduated from the Institut supérieur de l'aéronautique et de l'espace in 1963. He started his career in 1963 at Sud Aviation, the predecessor of Airbus Industrie, where he worked as a production engineer. He joined French aerospace manufacturer Aérospatiale in 1972, going on to head their commercial aircraft business. From 1972 to 1976, Pierson served as director of SOCATA, the light aircraft division of Aérospatiale, and then as director of the Toulouse office of Aérospatiale from 1976 to 1983.

Pierson succeeded Bernard Lathière as managing director of Airbus in March 1985. Lathière had lost his job due to a conflict between the German and French shareholders of the company. At the time, Airbus was not a significant competitor to the market leader, Boeing, which held a more than seventy percent market share in the commercial jetliner market. Airbus was often dismissed by market leader Boeing as a "minor nuisance" whose primary charter was to drive European jobs. Pierson's actions as leader included broadening the company's range of commercial jets and establishing a brand that could compete on quality. In a move to break into the U.S. commercial aviation market, Pierson recruited native-English talent and had a former US Transportation Secretary, Alan S. Boyd, take position as the North American leader. He also set up a pilot training centre in Florida as a finishing school for pilots of Airbus jets. In one of Airbus's first big wins, Northwest Airlines, which would later merge with Delta Air Lines, ordered 100 Airbus A320 jets. In another big win, US Airways, which later merged with American Airlines, placed an order for 400 jets in 1997. Pierson is famously known to have unbuckled his belt and dropped his trousers when at the last minute, a discount was demanded by the airline's CEO Stephen Wolf. Wolf is said to have ended the negotiation at that point, and signed the contract for 400 jets.

Pierson defended Airbus against Boeing and American allegations that the gains made by the corporation were primarily due to government subsidies by countering that Boeing benefited from military orders from the United States. In an interview to The New York Times in 1991, he said, "The Americans take the position that the Europeans are the black sheep and the Americans the white sheep, when the truth is that all the sheep are gray."

In addition to advancing the Airbus A320 program, he also set up the wide-bodied double-decker A3xx program which would later become the Airbus A380 program. He played a large role in the commercial development of Airbus Industries. While the Airbus A380 would prove to be a commercial failure many years later, with its last delivery in 2021, 14 years after the first flight, Pierson was known to have been right in calling the failure of the A400. He led investments to the Airbus A320 program and led the one-cockpit strategy while developing the Airbus A321, further cementing the A320 family of aircraft as the cash cow for the company. He also participated in the Concorde program and led investments into growth of the wide-bodied Airbus A330 and Airbus A340 programs.

Pierson retired from Airbus in 1998, after serving as managing director since 1985. During his time as leader, the company's global market share increased from 17% to 40%. In addition to breaking into the North American market, he was also credited with transforming Airbus from a loose consortium to a global competitor in the aviation industry. At the time that he took over as leader, Airbus was a consortium that brought together French Aérospatiale, West German Messerschmitt-Bölkow-Blohm, Britain's British Aerospace, and Spain's Construtores Aeronauticas, a combination of multiple state-owned firms relying on loans and credits from the host countries. He had to face regulatory threats and threats of retaliation from the Reagan administration which deemed the state support enjoyed by Airbus as anti-competitive. He began the process of the integration and creation of a unified corporation, calling the old model of the consortium outdated.

Pierson was known in the French media as "the Bear of the Pyrénées" in reference to his imposing personality and also to the Pyrenees mountains not too far from Airbus' headquarters at Toulouse.

Pierson died on 3 November 2021, at age 80.

== Distinctions ==
- Knight of the Legion of Honour
- Officer of the Ordre national du Mérite
- Doctor honoris causa of Cranfield University
- Prix Icare
