= Bernard Ziegler =

French engineer (1933–2021)

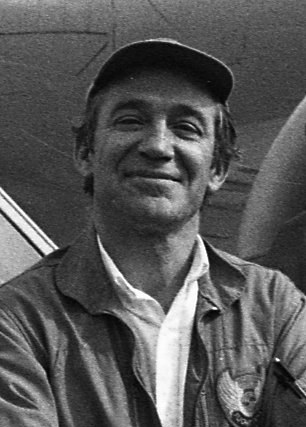
- Bernard Ziegler in 1982
- Born: 12 March 1933; Boulogne-Billancourt, France
- Died: 4 May 2021 (aged 88); Pibrac, Haute-Garonne, France
- Education: École Polytechnique; École de l'Air
- Occupations: Engineer; Test pilot
- Parent: Henri Ziegler

Bernard Ziegler (12 March 1933 – 4 May 2021) was a French pilot and engineer, who served in Airbus as senior vice president for engineering, well known for his evangelical zeal for the application of the fly-by-wire system in the Airbuses. He was the son of Airbus founder Henri Ziegler.

== Biography ==
Bernard Ziegler was born in Boulogne-sur-Seine, France. He was educated in the École Polytechnique (class of 1954), as an engineer and École de l'Air (1955), for his pilot training and military commission. Ziegler began his career as a fighter pilot in the French air force. He saw action in the Algerian War and was decorated twice. Principal medals and decorations received include the Officier de l’Ordre National du Mérite, Médaille de l'Aéronautique, Croix de la Valeur Militaire and Officier de la Légion d'honneur.

In August 1961 the Vallee Blanche Aerial Tramway was badly damaged when an aeroplane of the French Air Force piloted by Bernard Ziegler tore its hauling cable. Three cars crashed and six people were killed.

He continued his studies in École nationale supérieure de l'aéronautique et de l'espace (Supaéro) (1961) and was later posted to École du personnel navigant d'essais et de réception (EPNER), the French Air Force test pilot establishment in 1964. He was the chief test pilot for the Dassault Mirage G in 1968. At Airbus, his career spans from chief test pilot (1972), to senior vice president for flight and support and then, to senior vice president for engineering. As a test pilot, he flew the first flights of the Airbus A300, A310, A320 and the A340.

Bernard Ziegler was the most influential figure in developing the cockpit design and fly-by-wire control system for the Airbus airliners. He proposed that numerous technological innovations be applied to Airbus aircraft; for example, using composites, twin-engine configuration for the A300, fly-by-wire and many others. He was the guiding force in the creation of the flight envelope protection, incorporated in the Airbus flight-control software. This innovation allows the pilot to apply the maximum control forces considered necessary, while preventing inadvertent inputs that could place the aircraft outside the safety margin. This feature is considered by many to be highly beneficial in avoiding unusual attitudes in flight and in safely maximizing the effectiveness of evasive maneuvers in response to GPWS warnings.

For his efforts in advancing the fly-by-wire cause, he was honoured by the Flight Safety Foundation in 1998. He retired from Airbus after 25 years of service in 1997.

== Bibliography ==
- Cowboys d'Airbus by Bernard Ziegler, Privat, 2008.
