= Roger Béteille =

French aeronautical engineer (1921–2019)

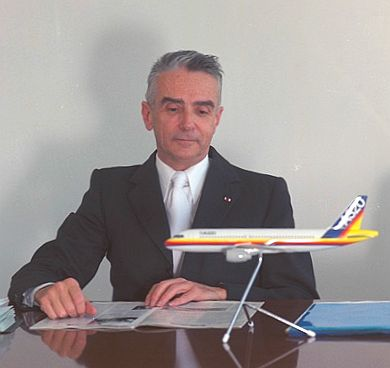
- Béteille in 1985
- Born: 28 August 1921; Vors, Aveyron, France
- Died: 14 June 2019 (aged 97)
- Education: École Polytechnique; Supaéro
- Occupations: Aeronautical engineer, businessman
- Years active: 1952–1984
- Known for: Contributions towards Airbus
- Spouse: Josette Jasmin
- Awards: Ludwig Prandtl Ring (1986)

Roger Béteille (28 August 1921 – 14 June 2019) was a French aeronautical engineer and businessman who was associated with Airbus. Regarded as one of the founding fathers of the company, he is known for his contributions towards Airbus, which contributed towards the aircraft manufacturer's initial success. He also worked for Air France, Lufthansa, United, TWA and American Airlines.

== Early life ==
Béteille was born in Vors, Aveyron, France. After graduating from École Polytechnique, he chose the Corps de l'armement and studied at Supaéro and at the Centre des hautes études de l'armement (CHEAr).

== Career ==
In 1952, he joined Sud-Aviation in Toulouse where he held senior posts: Head of Flight Testing (1952 to 1957), Head of Rockets and Satellites division (1957 to 1967) and the deputy technical director and A300 programme manager. He also played a decisive role in the "Armagnac" and "Caravelle" programmes.

He was one of the key players in the formation of the European Airbus consortium. Béteille had spent time listening to airlines such as Air France and Lufthansa, as well as visiting U.S. airlines such as United, TWA and American Airlines. He also decided that English should be the working language and that measurements should not be metric because most airlines already had American-built aircraft.

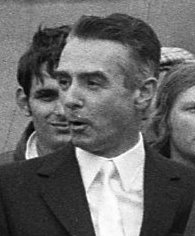
Béteille in 1972

A large part of the initial success of Airbus can be traced back to Béteille, whose nickname was Mister Airbus. His contributions include the "Airbus fuselage" – the 222-in fuselage cross section with the ability to carry two LD-3 freight containers – and the basic work-share agreement of the various partners in Airbus.

Béteille purchased Super Guppy transport aircraft to bring the pieces of the aircraft to its final assembly point in Toulouse. He long served as the company's chief operating officer and was regarded as one of the founding fathers, along with Henri Ziegler and Felix Kracht.

In 1983, he became a founding member of the French Académie de l'air et de l'espace (AAE). He retired in March 1984.

== Personal life ==
Béteille was awarded the Ludwig Prandtl Ring from the Deutsche Gesellschaft für Luft- und Raumfahrt (German Society for Aeronautics and Astronautics) in 1986. The Final Assembly Building for the Airbus A350 in Toulouse is named after him.

Béteille was married to opera singer Josette Jasmin and the two lived in Cannes and on the Midi.

He died on 14 June 2019, at age 97.

== Tribute ==
In tribute for his involvement within the Airbus Group, the A350XWB assembly plant in Toulouse was named after him.
