= Bernard Lathière =

French politician & former Airbus CEO (1929-1997)

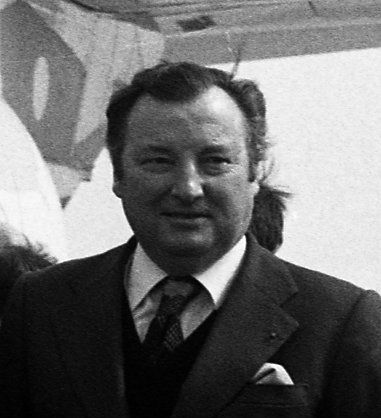
- Lathière in 1982

Chairman of the National Foreign Trade Center
- In office 1983–1992

Director of Air Transport
- In office 1968–1974

Inspector General of Finances
- In office 1957–1979

Personal details
- Born: 3 March 1929 Calcutta, Bengal, British Raj (now Kolkata, West Bengal, India)
- Died: 27 June 1997 (aged 68) Paris, France
- Education: École Nationale d'Administration (Strasbourg)

Bernard Lathière (French pronunciation: [bɛʁnaʁ latjɛʁ]; 4 March 1929 – 27 June 1997) was a French civil servant, politician, and businessman known for his contributions to French aviation.

Lathière is considered one of the founding fathers of Airbus, along with Franz Josef Strauss, Henri Ziegler, and Roger Béteille, as he served as the first managing director of Airbus Industrie. He also served as the chairman of the Board of Directors of Aéroports de Paris from 1986 to 1992, and was a director at Sud Aviation and the Société Nationale Industrielle Aérospatiale.

Outside of aviation, he also served as Inspector General of Finance and Chairman of the National Foreign Trade Center of France.

== Early life ==
Bernard Lathière was born on March 4, 1929, in Calcutta, British Raj (now Kolkata, India). He was the son of Jean Lathière, a Vichyssois politician from Limoges, and his wife Lucienne (née Fagneaux). Bernard grew up speaking English, Bengali, Limousin Occitan, and French.

He obtained a diploma from Paris Institute of Political Studies in 1953 and his legal license from Sorbornne University in 1954. He graduated from the École Nationale d'Administration in Strasbourg in 1955. He married Odette Duport in 1957.

== Career ==
Lathière began his career in 1955 in the Ministry of Economics and Finance as Deputy Inspector of Finance, and in 1957 was elected Inspector General of Finance. In 1958 he became a rapporteur for the Ministry's Foreign Trade Commission.

From 1959 to 1960, Lathière worked as a technology advisor to Minister of Armed Forces Pierre Guillaumat before becoming Chargé de mission of the Direction de la Construction in 1961. In 1962, he was hired as a technology advisor to Minister of Public Works Edgard Pisani. He was promoted to deputy director of Civil Transportation of the Ministry of Public Works in 1966 and appointed the Ministry of Transport's Director of Air Transport in 1968.

While serving as Director of Air Transport, Lathière also worked as the 1968 director of Sud Aviation and the 1970 director of the Société Nationale Industrielle Aérospatiale. He also served as the government liaison to Air France and Union de Transports Aériens from 1968 to 1971, and served as the French delegate to the Concorde project from 1969 to 1974.

In 1975, as the multinational aviation corporation Airbus Industrie began to grow, Lathière was brought in by chairman Franz Josef Strauss as the managing director of the company, the company's equivalent of a CEO. During his tenure as managing director, he was oversaw the projects of the Airbus A300, Airbus A310, and Airbus A320. He stepped down voluntarily in February 1985 after two five-year terms.

He was appointed Chairman of Aéroports de Paris in 1986 and served until 1992. Through this job he helped increase traffic to Charles de Gaulle Airport.

== Death and legacy ==
Lathière retired for health reasons in 1992 and died on June 27, 1997, in Paris.

During his lifetime, Lathière became an Officer of the Legion of Honour and a Commander of the Ordre national du Mérite, and was awarded a 1st class Médaille de l'Aéronautique.

Rue Bernard Lathière, a road connecting two major avenues in Limoges, is named after him.
