= N-Oleyl-1,3-propanediamine =

Names
- Preferred IUPAC name N^{1}-[(9Z)-Octadec-9-en-1-yl]propane-1,3-diamine
- Other names (Z)-N-9-octadecenylpropane-1,3-diamine

Identifiers
CAS Number	7173-62-8
3D model (JSmol)	Interactive image
ChemSpider	4940590
ECHA InfoCard	100.027.754
PubChem CID	40764
UNII	54XL96S8SY
CompTox Dashboard (EPA)	DTXSID0027644
- InChI: InChI=1S/C21H44N2/c1-2-3-4-5-6-7-8-9-10-11-12-13-14-15-16-17-20-23-21-18-19-22/h9-10,23H,2-8,11-22H2,1H3/b10-9- Key: TUFJPPAQOXUHRI-KTKRTIGZSA-N
- SMILES: CCCCCCCC/C=C\CCCCCCCCNCCCN

Properties
Chemical formula	C_{21}H_{44}N_{2}
Molar mass	324.597 g·mol^{−1}
Appearance	Colourless or yellow liquid
Odor	Ammoniacal
Density	0.841 g/cm^{3}
Melting point	12 °C (54 °F; 285 K)
Boiling point	300 °C (572 °F; 573 K)
Solubility in water	insoluble (at 20 °C)
Solubility	Soluble in acetone, methanol

Hazards
- GHS labelling
Pictograms	(GHS05: Corrosive) (GHS06: Toxic) (GHS07: Exclamation mark) (GHS08: Health hazard) (GHS09: Environmental hazard)
Signal word	Danger
Hazard statements	H290, H301, H302, H315, H318, H372, H410
Precautionary statements	P234, P260, P264, P270, P273, P280, P301+P330+P331, P302+P352, P304+P340, P321, P330, P362+P364, P363, P390, P391, P405, P501
NFPA 704 (fire diamond)	3 1 0
Flash point	54 °C (129 °F; 327 K)
- Safety data sheet (SDS)

Related compounds
Related amines	1,3-diaminopropane; oleylamine
- Except where otherwise noted, data are given for materials in their standard state (at 25 °C [77 °F], 100 kPa). Infobox references

N-Oleyl-1,3-propanediamine is an organic compound and a diamine with the formula C_{21}H_{44}N_{2}. It has found use in numerous industries. The main producer of commercial N-Oleyl-1,3-propanediamine is AkzoNobel, who sells it under the name Duomeen OL.

== Uses ==
N-Oleyl-1,3-propanediamine is used as a catalyst in the production of urethanes and epoxies. It is used as a emulsifier in the making of asphalt, an ore flotation agent, and a dispersant for some paints. It has also found use as a lubricant due to its unreactivity with cations, which are present in some adhesive manufacturing.
