= Charles Champion =

French businessman (21 November 1955)

- Born: 21 November 1955 (age 70); Fontenay-sous-Bois, France
- Education: Lycée Charlemagne; Supaéro; Stanford University
- Occupation: Businessman

Charles Champion (French pronunciation: [ʃaʁl ʃɑ̃pjɔ̃]; born 1955 near Paris), who holds a MSc from Stanford University, has been Airbus Executive Vice President Engineering since 1 April 2010 and a member of the Airbus Executive Committee.

After a 1978 graduation from the École nationale supérieure de l'aéronautique et de l'espace in Toulouse, he obtained a MSc from Stanford University.

Champion began his aviation career in 1980 as an aerodynamics engineer with Aérospatiale, where he worked in the production department of the aircraft division before heading the single-aisle aircraft assembly team from 1988 to 1992.

In 1993 he was appointed director of Airbus Programmes at Aérospatiale's Paris headquarters, and in 1995 became managing director of the military transport project named Future Large Aircraft or A400M.

In 1997, Champion joined Airbus as Vice President Sales for Eastern and Southern Europe and the CIS. From 1999 to 2000, he served as Product Executive for Airbus Single Aisle Programme. He also served as programme manager for the development of the Airbus A380 until he was removed in 2006 following controversy surrounding successive delays and cost overruns with the A380 program.

In 2007, he was appointed Executive Vice President in charge of Customer Services. This was a post he held until April 2010, when he became Executive Vice President Engineering in April 2010. In 2013 he was appointed Chairman, Airbus India, a subsidiary of Airbus.
