= Marwan Lahoud =

French-Lebanese engineer (born 1966)

- مروان لحود
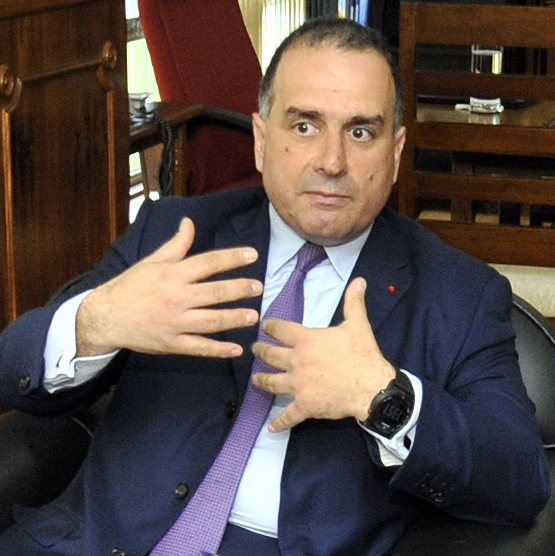
- Lahoud in 2015
- Born: 6 March 1966 (age 59); Lebanon
- Education: École Polytechnique
- Occupation: Weapons engineer
- Years active: 1989–present

Marwan Lahoud (Arabic: مروان لحود, born March 6, 1966) is a French-Lebanese weapons engineer who resides in France. He served as Deputy Chief Executive Officer for Strategy and Marketing for the Airbus Group until February 2017.

In May 2017, he was appointed Chairman of the Supervisory Board of IDEMIA (originally OT-Morpho) until February 14, 2018, when he was replaced by Yann Delabriere. However, he remained director of different entities of this group for two another years.

== Early life ==
Marwan Lahoud was born in Lebanon into a family of Lebanese Maronite Christians. He is the son of Victor Lahoud, a former Lebanese state intelligence officer.

In 1984, Lahoud joined the École Polytechnique, following two years of preparatory classes at the Sainte-Geneviève Jesuit Private High School in Versailles. Obtaining French nationality enabled him to join the Armaments Corps upon leaving the École Polytechnique in 1986. In this context, he chose the National Higher French Institute of Aeronautics and Space (ISAE-SUPAERO) for his training as an armaments engineer.

== Career ==
=== Civil servant ===
Marwan Lahoud began his career at the General Delegation for Armaments in 1989. In 1994, he became a project manager in the Technical Service for Tactical Missile Systems (STSMT), and was later appointed to the office of the Director of Missiles and Space at the DGA, Jean-Pierre Rabault.

At the end of 1995, he was an advisor for industrial affairs, research and armaments in the cabinet of Charles Millon, Minister of Defense. He participated in the restructuring of industries in the sector, notably with the ousting of Alain Gomez from Thomson-CSF. Lahoud also prepared the merger between Aerospace and Dassault Aviation but the process failed shortly before its end, because of the dissolution of National Assembly in 1997.

=== Aviation industry ===
Marwan Lahoud joined Aerospatiale in 1998 and became Vice-President for Development. In 2000, he negotiated the merger with Matra, the first step in the creation of EADS. In June 1999, Lahoud was appointed deputy to the Deputy Directors in charge of both strategic coordination and military affairs for Aérospatiale-Matra.

When EADS was created in July 2000, he was appointed Senior Vice-President of Mergers and Acquisitions, and as such, was responsible for EADS's large scale mergers, such as those leading to the creation of Airbus and MBDA. On January 1, 2003, at the age of 36, he became President and CEO of MBDA. Via an introduction to Jean-Louis Gergorin, his brother Imad followed in his footsteps, becoming involved in the Clearstream Affair.

In June 2007, Lahoud was appointed chief strategy and marketing officer of the EADS group, replacing Jean-Paul Gut. In this role, he began negotiations for a merger with BAE Systems, but this was never completed. In 2012, he was appointed Managing Director of EADS France, alongside his role as Strategic Director.

He was approached to take over leadership of Areva in 2010 but he did not take this on, and his name was also floated as a possible CEO for both Thales and Safran in 2014.

Airbus announced in a press release that he had left as their Chief Strategy and Marketing Officer. His departure was effective as of the end of February 2017.

=== Airbus controversies ===
Lahoud's departure from Airbus in February 2017 may be linked to a corruption scandal at the company. In what has become known as the "Kazakhgate" affair, his name has been linked to reports that bribes were systematically paid by Airbus to government officials in a number of countries in order to secure contracts for the sale of aircraft.

An investigation by Médiapart in July 2017 revealed that the French National Financial Prosecutor's Office (PNF) and its British counterpart, the Serious Fraud Office (SFO), had discovered illegal payments made by the Strategy and Marketing department of Airbus, at the time under Lahoud's leadership. In 2014, during a search conducted at Airbus Helicopters, the French Ministry of Justice discovered evidence that the company had agreed to pay €12,000,000 in bribes to the Prime Minister of Kazakhstan to facilitate a sale of 45 helicopters to the Kazakh government. Police from the Central Office for the Fight against Corruption and Financial Infractions (OCLCIFF) then searched the home of Marwan Lahoud on the morning of February 8, 2016.

According to a handwritten note claimed by Médiapart to be written by Lahoud, the total bribe payments were forecast to reach 250 million US dollars. However, Lahoud denies having written the note in question. Other documents from the same investigation reveal that these "commission" payments to officials were concealed by false invoices, such as one which was issued for a fictitious pipeline project in the Caspian Sea. As of 2017, Airbus continued to deny the allegations.

Médiapart reported another Kazakh corruption case in 2017, and an additional corruption case surrounding a sale of Aircraft aircraft in Egypt in 2019. In September 2019, it was also reported that Lahoud had been questioned by police in connection with an investigation into alleged kickbacks paid during the sale of Airbus aircraft to Libya.

In January 2020, the French press announced that courts in France, the United Kingdom, and the United States had approved the agreements reached between Airbus and the French National Financial Prosecutor’s Office (PNF), the UK Serious Fraud Office (SFO), and the U.S. Department of Justice (DOJ). Under these agreements, Airbus agreed to pay fines totalling €3.6 billion: €2.08 billion in France under a public interest judicial agreement (CJIP), €984 million in the United Kingdom, and €526 million in the United States. While UK prosecutors signalled no intent to continue investigation into the case following the agreement, the deal with Airbus did not provide individuals with immunity from future prosecution.

== Honors ==
=== Legion of Honor ===
Marwan Lahoud was knighted on April 9, 2004, then promoted to officer on July 12, 2013.
