= Dornier Consulting =

Dornier Group GmbH
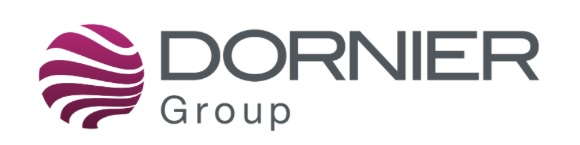
- Company type: GmbH (limited liability)
- Industry: Engineering, consulting and project management
- Founded: 1962, 1995 GmbH
- Headquarters: Berlin, Germany
- Key people: Dr. Ralf Hubert Gilgen, CEO; Christian Daumann, CEO; Patrick Pascal Rauh, CFO
- Products: Transportation/Infrastructure, Automotive, Aviation/Security, Environment/Water
- Revenue: 86 Mio. €
- Number of employees: ca. 2000 worldwide
- Website: www.dornier-group.com

Dornier Group GmbH is an international consulting and project management company that operates in the fields of traffic, transport, the environment and water.

The German parent company was established in 1962 from the former Dornier Planungsberatung in Friedrichshafen and was formed to focus on research and development projects for public and military facilities. Through Daimler-Benz, Dornier registered in 1995 to be an independent Business Unit of DaimlerChrysler Services as a limited liability (GmbH) planning and consulting company. At this time, the mobility services of the Daimler-Benz Group was introduced. With the founding of EADS in 2000, Dornier became a wholly owned subsidiary of EADS Deutschland GmbH.

In 2016, DCo generated revenues of approximately € 25 million and employed roughly 160 employees.

They have worked on projects for the European Union, various governments and authorities, the World Bank, Deutsche Bahn, Daimler, EADS and private customers as well.

The Business Units were restructured in 2007, which are now represented by the following four Business Lines:

- Transportation / Infrastructure
- Automotive
- Aerospace / Security
- Environment / Water

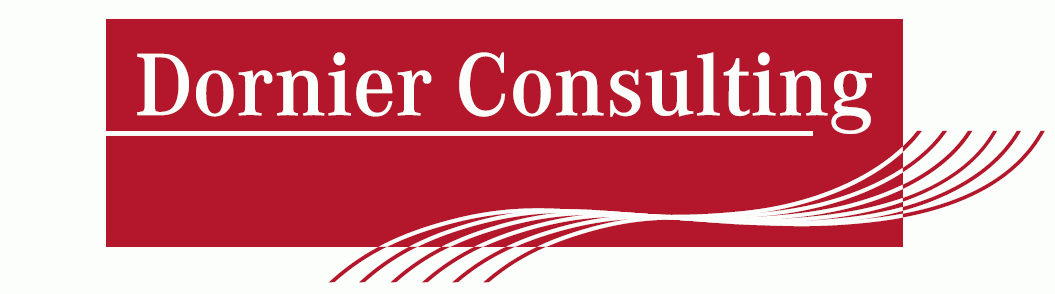
Old company logo (2005-2011)

Subsidiaries in Germany include: PM Academy (project management training), Projektmanagement GmbH (consulting for construction project management), Dornier Consulting Engineering & Services (DCES) (supports manufacturers and suppliers in the development and quality assurance for discrete vehicle electrical systems).
