= NAVBLUE =

Airbus subsidiary software company

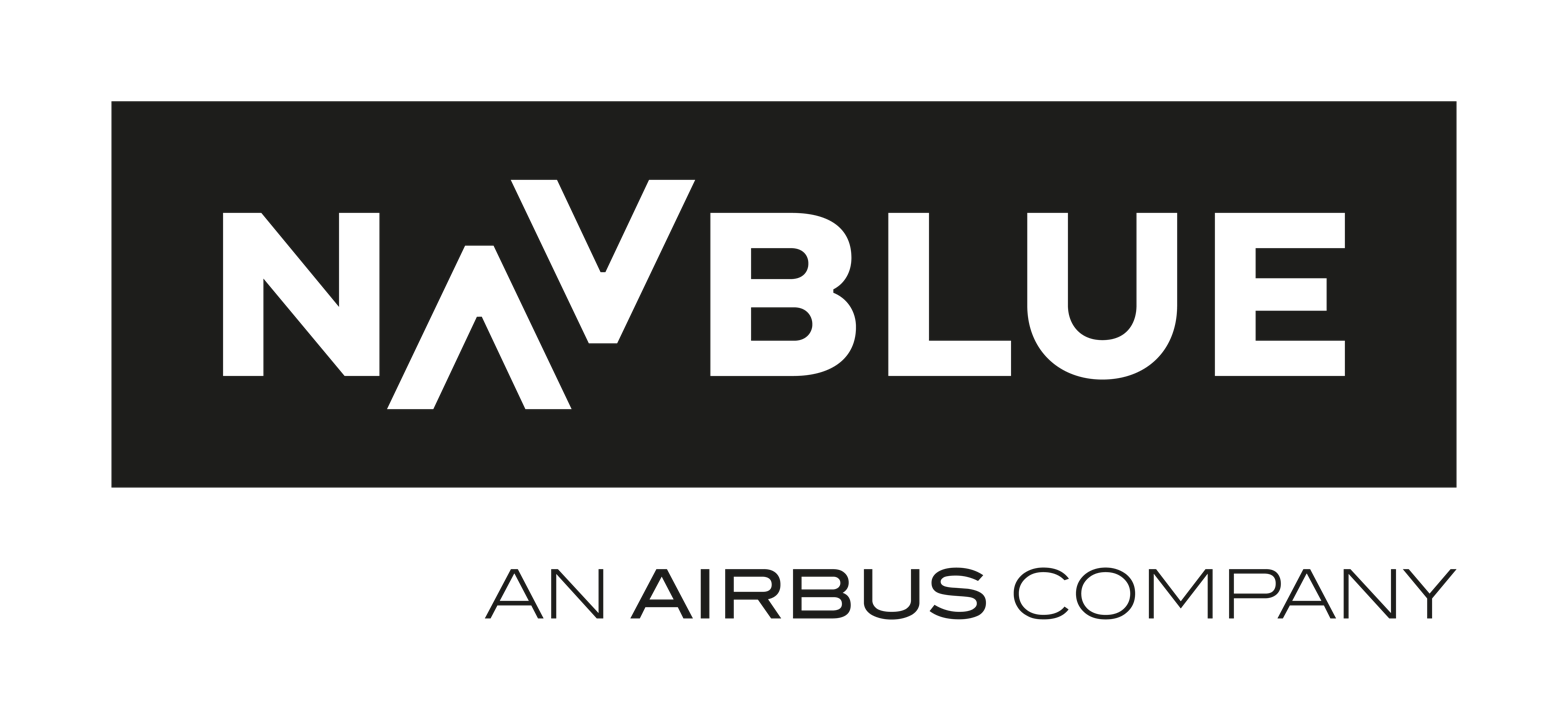
- Type: Subsidiary
- Industry: Aviation; Software
- Founded: Toronto, Ontario (1985)
- Headquarters: Waterloo, Ontario, Canada; Toulouse, France; Hersham, UK
- Area served: Worldwide
- Key people: Fabrice Hamel (Chairman); Marc Lemeilleur(Chief Executive Officer); Nathalie Lorenz (Chief Financial Officer); Briac Kerihuel (Chief Commercial Officer)
- Number of employees: 500
- Parent: Airbus
- Website: https://www.navblue.aero/

NAVBLUE, an amalgamation of Navtech, Airbus LUCEM and Airbus ProSky, is Airbus’ flight operations software subsidiary. They provide products which include software for flight planning, aircraft performance, flight data analysis, aeronautical charts, crew planning, electronic flight bag and navigational data. NAVBLUE is based in Toulouse, France with an additional headquarters in Waterloo, Ontario, Canada as well as a major office in Hersham, United Kingdom and several satellite offices worldwide.

== History ==
In the mid-1980s Ray English, an Air Canada pilot, conceived and developed a computer system to better calculate the benefits of tankering fuel for Air Canada. To his chagrin, the company showed no interest in the program despite the fact that it could save them millions of dollars per year. He consequently offered his program to Wardair who immediately recognized its value, but suggested that it would be better if he could create a flight plan program capable of incorporating the tankerage calculations. With the help of his wife Dorothy, a self-taught software engineer, and a small staff they expanded the concept of the original program to include not just a computerized flight planning function but a full-blown flight operations management system (FOMS). They began working in their garage in the small town of Elmira near Toronto, Ontario, Canada.

Over the next few years, Navtech acquired several customers, including Wardair, American Trans Air, Nationair, and Canada 3000. The Navtech concept was to provide small airlines with a fully independent in-house system rather than the typical centrally hosted service-bureau style of flight planning service offered by others such as Jeppesen, Compuflight, and Borneman.

One of the most significant features of the Navtech flight planning software was its ability to calculate the minimum time route along published airways between any origin and destination using the appropriate forecast winds and temperatures for the speed and altitude range of the aircraft type employed. This "MTTA" functionality was a radical improvement over other competing systems that, like the original Navtech offering, could only assess which was the best route of those currently on file.

As Internet communications developed, Navtech also developed a hosted implementation of their flight operations management product which allowed customers to communicate remotely with Navtech computers to request and generate a flight plan. Navtech merged with Compuflight, a flight operations services provider based in Long Island, New York, in 1994 to expand its flight planning market share and to introduce runway analysis service to its customers.

Navtech further augmented its flight operations service portfolio in 1998 when it acquired the Weather Service Division of Global Weather Dynamics Inc. (GWDI) which was based in Monterey, California. In 1999, Navtech acquired Skyplan's UK division to accelerate its growth in the European market.

In 2001, Navtech acquired Airware Solutions, Inc. and entered the Crew Planning market, providing the industry's leading Preferential Preferential Bidding System. A partnership was created with Parallel Integrated Applications Systems to offer airlines its Pairings Optimizer.

In 2005, Navtech acquired European Aeronautical Group, a group founded by Scandinavian Airlines, British Airways and a number of avionics manufacturers.

In 2015, Navtech acquired DW International Limited, an industry leader of Performance Based Navigation (PBN) software

In 2016, Airbus acquired Navtech and merged it with Airbus LUCEM and Airbus ProSky to form NAVBLUE.

On November 17, 2016, NAVBLUE signed a three-years contract with the Vietnam Air Traffic Management Corporation and the Civil Aviation Administration of Vietnam for a full redesign of the national air traffic plan, in cooperation with the three top airline companies and the two busiest airports- Tan Son Nhat International Airport and Noi Bai International Airport.

In 2020 NAVBLUE acquires Aviolinx and the RAIDO application to complete the N-Operations Control Centre Suite, and enhances its Flight Operations and Air Traffic Management Portfolio.

== Products ==
Navtech's first product was Navtech Flight Plan, now marketed as Navblue Flight Plan. This allows airlines to manage the costs associated with flight operations, minimizing spending on fuel consumption, operating costs, and flight time. Navtech has developed two aircraft performance computer applications:

- Navtech TODC, which provides customized take-off and landing performance calculations, and
- Navtech AODB, which provides airport data used during take-off and landing procedures.

Navblue's aeronautical charting products create aerodrome and en-route navigation charts as well as those used for helicopter operations. Navtech's crew planning software, the Preferential Bidding System builds both flying and reserve schedules with an add-on module for training schedules. Pairing Optimizer is a desktop application which produces crew pairings covering various scheduling periods.

Navblue's software creates and uses large aeronautical and navigational databases for flight management systems and flight simulators, as well as ground positioning systems, aircraft simulators, airspace modelling, and air traffic systems. Electronic flight bag software provides Navtech tools to pilots electronically on a laptop or tablet.
