= Henri Ziegler =

President of Airbus (1906–1998)

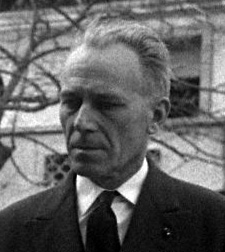
- Born: 18 November 1906; Limoges, France
- Died: 24 July 1998 (aged 91); Paris, France
- Education: École Polytechnique, Supaéro
- Occupation: Founder of Airbus

Henri Ziegler CVO, CBE (18 November 1906 in Limoges – 24 July 1998, in Paris) was one of the founders of Airbus and its first president.

An engineer, he was a graduate of the École Polytechnique and of "Sup'Aéro" (the national aerospace engineering school) as well as a French air force officer and test pilot. he was a founding father of Airbus Industrie, along with Roger Béteille and Felix Kracht, and was appointed as the first chief executive officer of Airbus Industrie. He was the driving force behind the development of the Airbus A300B, the original aircraft that started Airbus on its road to global success, by obtaining French government backing for the programme in 1969.

== Early life ==
Following his appointment as assistant director of the Centre d'Essais en Vol (government flight test centre) in 1938, he fought for the French Resistance during World War II. In 1944 he was made commander of the Free French air forces in London, going on to become chief of staff of the French Forces of the Interior under General Koenig. He was awarded the Croix de guerre 1939–1945 with three palms, the Médaille de la Résistance with rosette and appointed officer on the US Legion of Merit.

== Aerospace career ==
While acting as a special representative of the French government in Britain and the United States, Ziegler was also managing director of Air France from 1946 to 1954. In subsequent years he was the founder of Air Alpes, a member of several cabinet ministries, president of Avions Breguet; president of Sud Aviation (1968), leader of the Franco-British supersonic airliner project Concorde, and president and CEO (1970–1973) of SNIAS (Société Nationale Industrielle Aérospatiale), which was renamed Aérospatiale in 1984.

From 1971 to 1973, Ziegler was also managing director of the French Aerospace industries trade organisation (Usias), retiring from Airbus in 1975. In 1973, Ziegler received the Tony Jannus Award, along with Geoffrey Knight, for distinguished contributions to commercial aviation. Ziegler was the father of Bernard Ziegler, the former Airbus Director of Engineering.

== Honours ==
During his career, Ziegler was the recipient of several honours, including Grand Officer of the Légion d'honneur, honorary Commander of the Order of the British Empire (CBE) and honorary Commander of the Royal Victorian Order (CVO).

"There would be no Airbus without Henri Ziegler," Airbus CEO Gustav Humbert declared on 11 April 2006 at the dedication of the new Airbus delivery centre in Toulouse named in his honour.
