= Jean-Paul Gut =

French businessman

- Education: Sciences Po
- Occupation: Economist

Jean-Paul Gut is a trained economist and a former executive at the European Aeronautic Defence and Space Company (EADS), now a part of Airbus.

== Career ==
Jean-Paul Gut graduated from Sciences Po in Paris with a master's degree in economics.

He began his career at Matra. When Matra and Aérospatiale merged in 2000, he was appointed President of Aerospatiale Matra Lagardère International and Deputy Director in charge of defense and space transportation.

=== EADS (now Airbus) ===
In 2005, Gut became the executive director of the European Aeronautic Defence and Space Company (EADS), and director of EADS International, which became part of Airbus. In June 2006, when Jean-Louis Gergorin left EADS, he was assigned to be in charge of the company's global strategy, thus becoming executive director of marketing and strategy, overseeing all international operations, and heading the division called SMO-IO, staffed with 150 employees, running a budget of $ 300 millions.

A year later, in June 2007, he resigned from EADS, and was replaced by Marwan Lahoud. His severance pay was said to be 2.8 million euros, the equivalent of a 24-month salary for 24 years worked at the company. In fact, Gut had received more than 80 million euros, in a covered payment, as was revealed later by the French investigative newspaper Mediapart.

=== Consulting company ===
Gut created his own consulting company in London, Coolmore International, catering to French and European companies looking to expand internationally, and connecting foreign investors with European corporations working on large-scale development projects. In 2007, one of his main clients was Airbus.

=== Suspicions of insider trading ===
In June 2008, Gut was indicted for insider trading. He was accused of selling his EADS shares in March 2006 based on information indicating that the Airbus A380 and A350 programs would face delays, which heavily negatively impacted the stock price following the official announcement. On December 17, 2009, the Financial Markets Authority overruled its rapporteur who sought sanctions, cleared Gut of any wrongdoing, and the case was closed without penalties. However, the prosecutor's office maintained the accusation. In 2014, a criminal trial was initiated by the prosecutor's office, but following a priority constitutional question, the Constitutional Council upheld the application of the non bis in idem principle (double jeopardy), and the case was definitively closed without conviction.
