= Testia =

Airbus' aircraft inspection / testing company

- Company type: Subsidiary
- Industry: Aerospace
- Founded: 1991
- Headquarters: Toulouse, France
- Number of locations: 10+ (2018)
- Area served: Worldwide
- Products: SmartUE1, SmartU32, D-lam tool, LineSizing, OMA
- Services: NDT Inspection, Training, Examination, Consulting, Level 3
- Revenue: €27 million (2017)
- Number of employees: 350 (2020)
- Parent: Airbus
- Subsidiaries: InFactory Solutions
- Website: testia.com

Testia, an Airbus company, is a training, services and products provider for aerostructure testing and Non-Destructive Testing (NDT). It has been fully owned by Airbus since 2013.

== Current activities ==
Testia (under "NDT Expert" name at that time) was launched by Aerospatiale (now Airbus) research center in 1991 as an aerospace-specialized player for Non-Destructive Testing.

After several partnerships with industrial players as well as research centers, the company became the internal and external provider for inspection, training, consulting, engineering, periodic verification, fluids testing, Go/No-Go tools, multi-purpose equipment, augmented reality, drones, and remote assistance. These activities are leveraging the different techniques of NDT like ultrasound, radiography, tomography, penetrant, infrared thermography, magnetization, shearography or Eddy current that allow the detection and assessment of a defect on metallic or composite materials (CFRP, ALM, HRD).

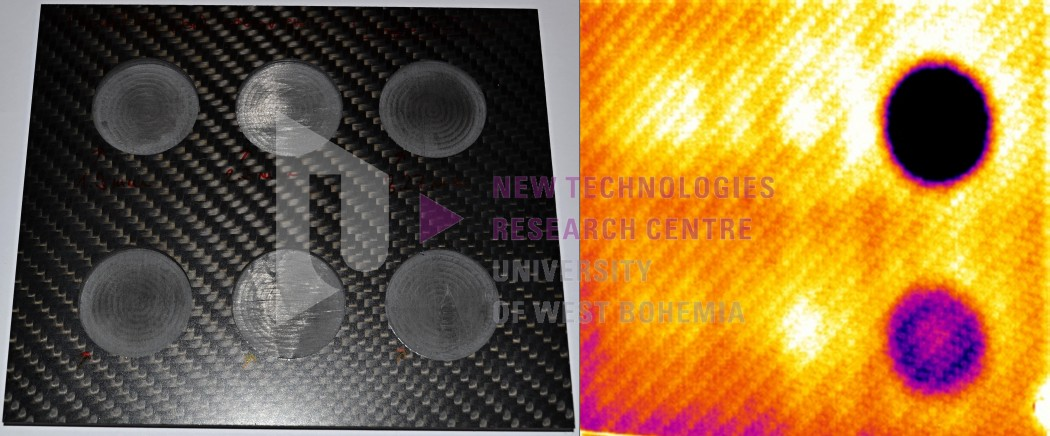
Example of testing

The company is a NADCAP organization for manufacturing and an EASA/FAR PART 145 organization for in-service activities.

In 2018, the company had 250 employees across 7 countries: France, UK, Spain, Germany, Canada, Singapore and Mexico. Due to the NDT market growth, the company is planning on opening in China and Middle-East in 2019.

== History ==
In 1991, Aérospatiale, in collaboration with Bureau Veritas and Sogerma, established the NDT Expert company within its R&D department at the historic Blériot plant in Suresnes. This initiative aimed to support the aerospace sector by providing training and certification for NDT inspectors in compliance with the EN4179 standard. A secondary objective was to stay at the forefront of advancements in NDT technologies developed at the Aérospatiale research center, ensuring aircraft structural reliability, performance, and quality in accordance with regulatory requirements.

In 1996, the company moved from Suresnes to Toulouse to be closer to industrial activities. Around the same time, Sogerma sold its shares to EADS, the new name for Aérospatiale. in 2012 Following the creation of EADS then Airbus a strategic initiative was launched, bringing together several key aerospace companies, including Aérospatiale (France), Deutsche Airbus (Germany), Hawker Siddeley (United Kingdom), and CASA (Spain). At that time, it was decided to seize the opportunity to harmonize non-destructive testing (NDT) training and certification across the company in accordance with the European standard EN4179. Didier Simonet, who was then head of Airbus Group Innovation in Toulouse, was appointed to establish this structure. 2015, NDT Expert rebranded as Testia, aligning with Airbus's strategic focus on non-destructive testing (NDT) services. In June 2015, Airbus Group acquired the 20% stake held by Bureau Veritas, making Testia a wholly owned subsidiary of Airbus Group

Across the following years, the company developed in being as well a provider for NDT training & certification (NAS410/EN4179), services and products. This led to the creation of several Testia sites in France, Mexico (2011), UK (2013), Germany (2013), Spain (2013), Singapore (2014) and Canada (2018).

In 2016 Testia was recognized for the launch of several products and software, like its NDT tool for A350XWB composite, the Augmented Reality to Spirit AeroSystems and its contribution to Airbus 'Hangar of the Future".

In 2017, Testia started business in Structural Health Monitoring and was granted Customer Value Leadership award.

As of April 2018, Testia is the launching partner of Airbus Advanced Inspection Drone.
