= Satair =

Danish aircraft component and service company

Satair is an aircraft component and service company based in Copenhagen, Denmark. Founded in 1957, Satair services range from parts supply and distribution to tailor-made services. The company became a wholly owned subsidiary of Airbus in 2011.

== History ==
=== Early history ===
Satair was founded in 1957. On December 23, 1957, Blicher Jensen, an SAS engineer, and ten of his colleagues founded the Scandinavian Air Trading Co. A/S, collectively putting up share capital of DKK 50,000. The chairman of the company was Helge W. Hansen, and for the early years Satair was based at his home address. All aspects of buying and selling were handled by the 11 stakeholders; the accounting was performed by Helge W. Hansen's wife.

In 1960, Satair had expanded to the point where it needed a formal office and employees. The first employee of the company was Tove Jeppesen, who was hired as a secretary. The company continued to grow and by 1970 had 24 employees and an annual net revenue of DKK20 million. In 1979 the company invested in a new warehouse and office building at Amager Landevej 151, Kastrup, Denmark.

By 1980, Satair had 65 employees and revenue over DKK100 million.

=== Fire ===
On December 22, 1981, one of Satair's 1967 warehouses caught fire, causing several explosions and necessitating the evacuation of nearby residents. Firefighting efforts continued for two hours but were unable to prevent complete property destruction at the warehouse, resulting in an estimated loss of DKK 30 million to Satair.

=== Later history ===
Satair opened a subsidiary in the United States in 1986 and an office in Singapore in 1988. However, in 1990 a heavy recession in aviation forced Satair to downsize, especially with regard to its activities within aircraft rental and trade.

Although Satair originally did not believe it likely that the First Gulf War would impact its business, the hold on purchases put in place by the aviation industry caused Satair sales to drop 60% in the 1991/1992 fiscal year, and as a result the company was forced to downsize its workforce by 23 jobs, 17% of its total staff at the time.

In 1994 Knud Soerensen, the company's CEO, retired and was replaced by John Staer, who was previously the Chief Financial Officer with Ambu International A/S. For the remainder of the 1990s Satair continued to grow and set up subsidiaries in Malaysia and China, as well as taking over companies in France and Switzerland. On June 3, 1997, Satair A/S obtained a listing on the Copenhagen Stock Exchange.

In 2000, Satair's revenues exceeded DKK 1 billion. The company launched multiple new concepts, including Satair Direct, the Group's e-commerce concept, and IPP (a new service concept).

In 2001, Satair made the decision to merge its OEM activities with the UK-based C.J. Fox & Sons Ltd. and established Satair Hardware Group. Satair acquired Lentern (Aircraft) Ltd and Lentern International Inc. in 2003, and in 2005 acquired the United States-based Pall Corporation's distribution activities for Pall products in the commercial aftermarket in North and South America. Satair purchased TPA Pte Ltd. in 2006, and in 2008 acquired a 49% holding in the Chinese repair company Sichuan Ruibo. In 2010, Satair purchased the US-based Aero Hardware, and in 2011 acquired the UK-based Aero Quality Sales.

In November 2011, Satair A/S was delisted from NASDAQ OMX Copenhagen and became a 100% owned subsidiary of Airbus. Satair remained a stand-alone brand and continued as such under Airbus ownership.

On January 1, 2014, Satair Group was officially launched as the merged organization between Airbus Material & Logistics Management and Satair A/S. The group also opened a new joint facility in Singapore. In February Satair and Airbus opened their first joint warehouse in Singapore.

On November 1, 2016, Bart Reijnen took over as CEO of Satair Group succeeding former CEO Mikkel Bardram.

On February 6, 2018, Satair Group adapted its name, logo and visual identity thus transforming into a new identity under the name of Satair.

On July 20, 2022, Satair acquired the US-based aviation aftermarket services company VAS Aero Services under its US legal entity Satair USA, Inc.

On October 1, 2023, Richard Stoddart became the new CEO of Satair and Head of Airbus Material Services taking over from former CEO Bart Reijnen.

On November 1, 2023, Satair (Chengdu) Co Ltd was established as a legal entity of Satair to purchase pre-owned aircraft and manage trade of used aircraft materials in association with the Airbus Lifecycle Services Center in Chengdu.

== Current activities ==
Today, Satair is a part of Satair Group which is the result of the merged organisation between Satair A/S and Airbus Material Management & Logistics. Satair Group and its two channel brands work with a common management and organisational structure. Today, the company has more than US$3 billion in revenues and +1,700 employees at 10 locations worldwide. It has exclusive and primary distribution arrangements for aerospace component manufacturers and supplies these parts to civil airlines, MROs and other customers. It also fulfils the Airbus support obligation for proprietary materials and services for a fleet of over 7,000 Airbus in-service aircraft.
