= Gustav Humbert =

- Born: 1950 (age 75–76); Celle, Lower Saxony, West Germany
- Occupation: Business executive
- Employer: Airbus

Gustav Humbert (born February 1950 in Celle, West Germany) is the former chief executive officer and president of Airbus SAS, and a former member of the EADS executive committee.

== Early life and education ==
Humbert holds a degree in mechanical engineering from the Hannover Technical University as well as a PhD in engineering from the Leibniz University Hannover , and was a visiting professor of mechanical engineering at McGill University in Montreal in 1979.

== Career ==
Humbert joined Airbus management in July 2000, as the chief operating officer and a member of the EADS' (Airbus' parent company) executive committee, and in March 2004 he was appointed Airbus' executive vice-president – programmes.

In June 2005 he was appointed Airbus president and chief executive officer, a position he held until 2 July 2006, when he resigned from these various positions as a result of further delays on the Airbus A380 production line and other delivery program setbacks, announced the previous month, on 14 June.

While announcing his resignation, Humbert said the delays were a "major disappointment" for Airbus, and "as President and CEO of Airbus, must take responsibility for this setback and ... offer my resignation to our shareholders."

== See also ==
- EADS
- Airbus
- DASA
- DaimlerChrysler
- Airbus A380
- Noël Forgeard
