= Cast urethanes =

Forming method for a type of plastic

Cast urethanes are similar to injection molding. During the process of injection molding, a hard tool is created. The hard tool, made of an A side and a B side, forms a void within and that void is injected with plastics ranging in material property, durability, and consistency. Plastic cups, dishware, and toys are most commonly made using the process of injection molding because they are common consumer items that need to be produced on a mass scale, and injection molding (once the hard tool has been created) is designed for mass production.

Casting urethanes is similar in that polyurethanes are injected into a tool. But with cast urethanes, the tool is a soft tool, typically made with a type of silicone mold. The mold is created via a master pattern. Master patterns for cast urethanes can be created with CNC machining (which is a common process for injection molding) but cast urethane master patterns are often created with additive manufacturing (or 3D Printing) and the reasons for this vary.

Creating a cast urethane master pattern is different from the steps involved in creating hard tooling for injection molding. Hard tools for injection molding are going to be subjected to a lot of stress and heat during the injection process. They will see runs of thousands of parts per day. The care that goes into a hard tool involves intense machine programming which costs thousands of dollars alone. The price for hard tooling is balanced by the mass production the tooling brings, which is where cast urethanes begin to differ. Cast urethanes are suited for smaller runs of parts and prototyping. Because the cost for soft tooling is lower, down in the hundreds rather than hundreds of thousands, cast urethanes are excellent resources for creators still testing product design, for one-off products, or for testing market and consumer response to a new product.

== Master patterns ==
Cast urethane master patterns can be produced using machining, additive manufacturing—even an already existing product. The master pattern is used to create an A side and a B side for a mold. The pattern is used to form a void within a mold. The mold material is one that easily picks up surface detail (such as silicones) because the mold will be responsible for reflecting the surface of the product.

== Applications ==
There are many types of cast urethane applications including:

- molded bearings
- covered rollers
- cast wheels
- FDA approved cast parts
- seals and gasket covers
- bushings
- blocks
- sheets
- fiberglass applications
- plastic bottles

== Process ==
Cast urethane starts as a liquid that can be dispensed into a mold, post cured in ovens and where required, secondary machining operations can be added. Cast thermoset urethanes have better physical properties than most injection or extruded thermoplastics. Dispensing liquid urethane into open molds or compression tools makes it possible to cast just about any configuration from affordable tooling.

Steps include first printing a master pattern for an accurate silicone mold, which is then encased in liquid silicone. After the mold cures, it is cut into distinct sections and the pattern is removed. The cavity formed is used for casting the end product. The cavity or void is filled with a material, which will cure and be removed from the tool.

== Equipment required ==
The equipment required for the work includes: mixing equipment, mold release agent, vacuum chamber and pump, heating equipment, personal protective equipment, mold, workbench or table, clamps or weights.

== Industries ==
The types of industries that utilize cast urethane include:

- Distribution Centers
- Printing
- Wheels for Skateboards, Robots and other rotating applications
- Conveyor Systems
- rapid prototyping

== Benefits of cast urethane ==
- Abrasion resistance
- Reduction of noise
- Excellent tear strength
- High / Low temperature
