= Institut supérieur de l'aéronautique et de l'espace =

French engineering college

Coordinates: 43°34′00″N 1°28′30″E

Institut supérieur de l'aéronautique et de l'espace ISAE-SUPAERO
- Motto: Excellence with passion
- Type: Grande école
- Established: 1909; 117 years ago
- Location: Toulouse, France
- Website: www.isae-supaero.fr

The Institut supérieur de l'aéronautique et de l'espace (French pronunciation: [ɛ̃stity sypeʁjœʁ də laeʁɔnotik e də lɛspas], ISAE-SUPAERO; lit. 'Higher Institute of Aeronautics and Space') is a French grande école of engineering, founded in 1909. It is the world's first dedicated institute of aerospace engineering. ISAE-SUPAERO is part of University of Toulouse, ISSAT, PEGASUS, GEA, Toulouse Tech, CESAER and Aerospace Valley. The institute is ranked highly among Europe's engineering schools.

Historically ISAE-SUPAERO resulted from the merger between SUPAERO and ENSICA in the summer of 2007. The aim of this move was to increase the international visibility of SUPAERO and the ENSICA (both of which depend on the French Ministry of Defense), by sharing their faculty and experimental means. The institute also delivers continuing education through its subsidiary, EUROSAE.

In 2011, ISAE founded Groupe ISAE with the engineering school, ENSMA. In 2012, Groupe ISAE was joined by ESTACA and by École de l'air et de l'espace, which trains officers of the French Air and Space Force. In January 2018, the Supméca, now called ISAE-SUPMECA, joined the group. In February 2022, the École nationale de l'aviation civile, the biggest European aviation university, also joined the group.

== History ==
=== Creation of ISAE in 2007 ===
In June 2025, the school created the Toulouse School of Aviation and Aerospace Engineering in partnership with ENAC.

== National rankings and acceptance rates ==
National ranking (ranked for its Master of Sciences in Engineering)

Name	Year	Rank
DAUR Rankings	2024	7
L'Etudiant	2022	11 ea
L'Usine Nouvelle	2025	7
Le Figaro	2025	4

The undergraduate admission to ISAE-SUPAERO in the engineer cycle is made through two ways: the first pathway by which most students are recruited, is a very selective examination which requires at least two years of very intensive preparation after high school in classes préparatoires. The other pathway corresponds to the recruitment of about twenty undergraduate students from universities. For both ways, admission includes a week of written examinations during the spring followed by oral examinations that are handled in batches (séries) over the summer.

About only 200 students from classes préparatoires or French universities are admitted to the prestigious school each year.

Number of students accepted following the French national exam (2018)
Classes préparatoires (Majors)					University
Maths & Physics	Physics & Engineering Science	Physics & Chemistry	Physics & Technology	Technology & Industrial Science	/
78	79	34	6	2	23

The average acceptance rates of the national examination taken by students from classes préparatoires are indicated below:

	Number of applicants	Average acceptance rates
2018	14 764	12.76%
2017	14 686	11.63%
2016	14 681	11.62%
2015	14 193	11.86%
2014	14 443	9.7%

== Notable alumni ==
Notable alumni include:

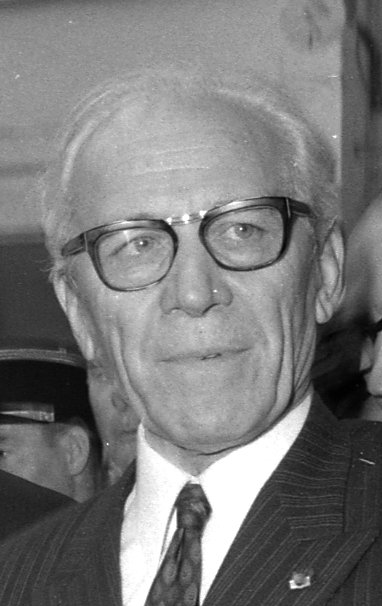
Henri Ziegler, father of the Airbus program.

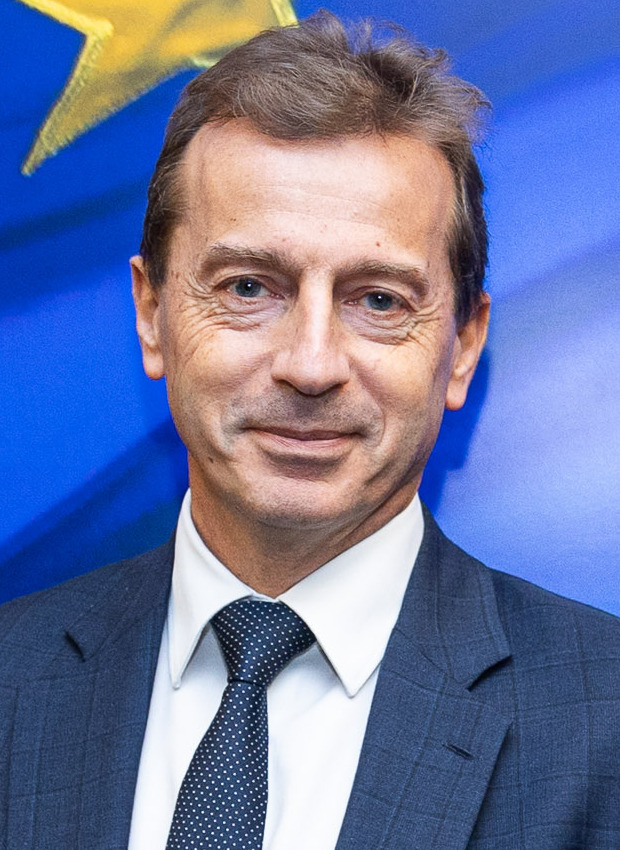
Guillaume Faury, CEO of Airbus since 2019.

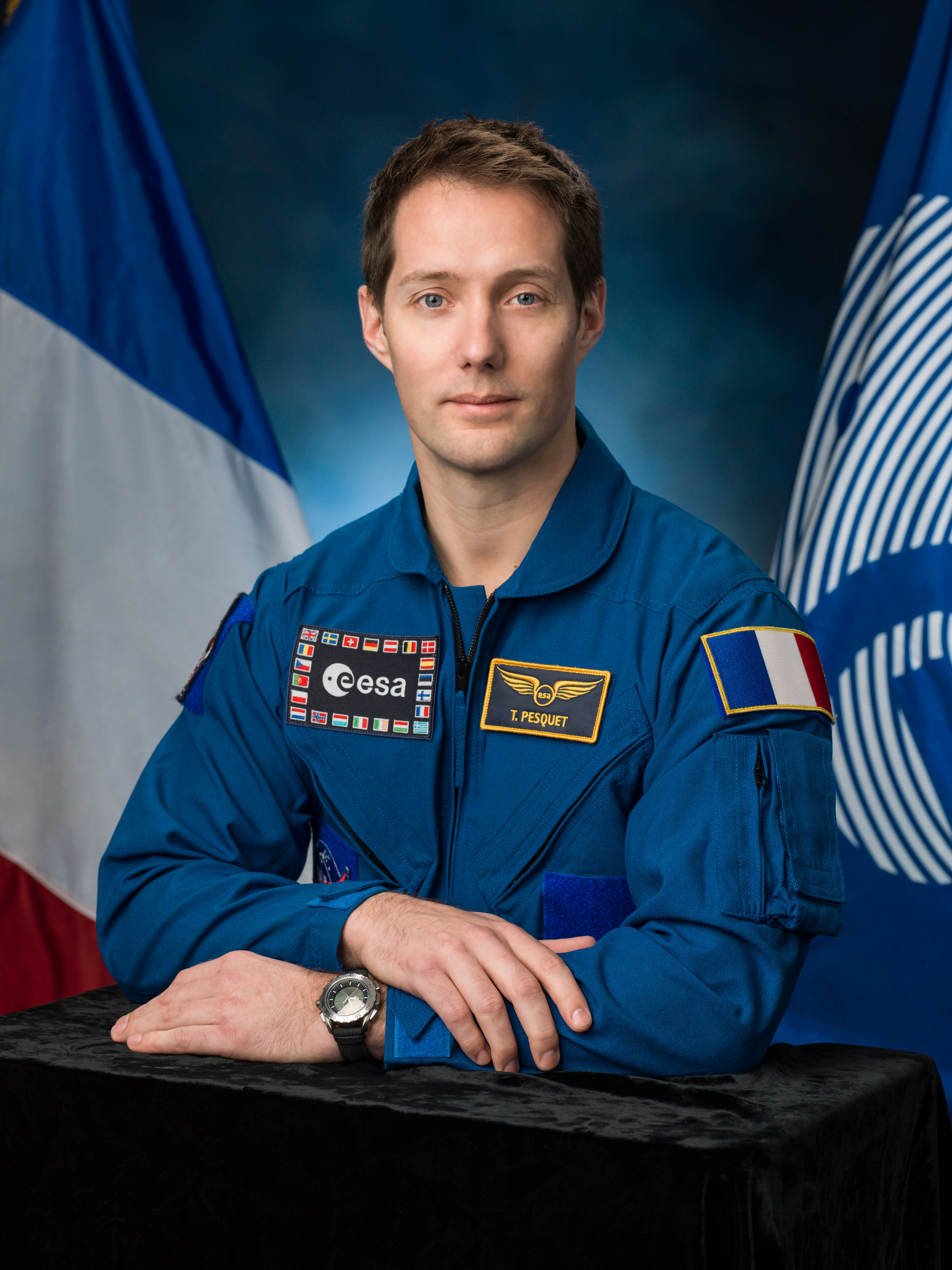
Thomas Pesquet, French astronaut.

- Raoul Badin, S-1910, one of the main inventors of the airspeed indicator and forefather of instrument flying.
- Henri Coandă, S-1910, discovered the Coandă Effect; Romanian designer of the first jet plane.
- Henry Potez, S-1911, founder of the Potez airplanes company.
- Mikhail Gurevich, S-1913, founder of MiG
- Marcel Bloch-Dassault, S-1913, founder of the Dassault airplanes company.
- René Couzinet, S-1925, aircraft designer, conceived the Couzinet 30 Arc-en-Ciel, the famous plane flown by Jean Mermoz, and also invented the retractable landing gear and the modern yoke.
- Henri Ziegler, S-1931, father of the Airbus program.
- Guy du Merle, S-1932, first director-general of the École nationale de l'aviation civile (French civil aviation university).
- François Hussenot, S-1935, inventor of the "hussenographe" (an early form of Flight data recorder or "black box"); also involved in the creation of EPNER.
- Jean-Claude Laprie (1944–2010), E-1968, director of research at the CNRS, former director of the LAAS-CNRS, silver medal of CNRS.
- Serge Dassault, S-1951, CEO of Dassault Aviation.
- Jacques Darricau, E-1961, an internationally recognized radar specialist, former president of EUROSAE and director of the SAE.
- Daniel Ferbeck, S-1963, creator of VAL (automated metro subway system).
- Eric Hayat, S-1964, Founder of STERIA.
- Louis Le Portz, E-1964, Former commissary general of Paris Air Show, former CEO of Thomson Training & Simulation (1994–1998).
- Francis Bernard, E-1965, first CEO of Dassault Systèmes.
- Frédéric d'Allest, S-1966, first chairman of Arianespace.
- Seddik Belyamani, E-1967, MS MIT, Former Executive Vice President of Boeing. (1998–2002)
- Rachid BenMokhtar Benabdellah, E-1967, Minister of National Education of Morocco (1995–1998 and since 2013).
- Jean Laurent, S-1967, Former CEO of Crédit Agricole and Chairman & CEO of Crédit Lyonnais.
- Bernard Ramanantsoa, S-1971, Director of HEC Paris (1996–2015).
- Philippe Wallet, E-1973, Director Aircraft Engineering and Maintenance, Air France.
- Serge Massart, E-1975, Special adviser to the CEO of EDF, former Director of the Nuclear Engineering Division then Director of Nuclear Operations.
- Jean-Paul Herteman, S-1975, former CEO of Safran.
- Alain Pechon, E-1977, Founder and former CEO of Sun Microsystems France.
- Charles Champion, S-1978, Senior VP Engineering Airbus.
- Marie-Laure Roux, E-1981, Director of the Toulouse St Eloi factory of Airbus since 2011.
- Jean-François Clervoy, S-1983, astronaut.
- Alain Bellemare, E-1985, MBA McGill 93, CEO of Bombardier, Ex-CEO of Pratt & Whitney Canada.
- Marc Guinot, E-1985, Vice President A380 Chief Engineer, Airbus.
- Jean Kayanakis, E-1986, Chief executive of Dassault Falcon Services.
- Marwan Lahoud, S-1989, Chief Strategy and Marketing Officer of Airbus Group.
- Christophe Robin, E-1991, Technical director of Daher-Socata, Founder of DynAero an aeronautical construction company.
- Diego Diaz, E-1992, MS MIT, MBA MIT Sloan, Vice President of SNCF International.
- Guillaume Faury, S-1992, current CEO of Airbus Group and former president of Airbus Commercial Aircraft.
- Thomas Pesquet, S-2001, astronaut.
- Samantha Cristoforetti, S 2007 (ERASMUS), astronaut.
- Luca Parmitano, M-I-2009, astronaut.
- Vincent Lecrubier, S-2011, Olympic Games 2008–2012, Kayak Champion.
- Pascal Vasselon, 2000–2004 Michelin Competition, Director F1, since 2010 Toyota MotorsportGmbH, Technical Director

== See also ==
- List of aerospace engineering schools
