= Airbus A300 =

World's first twin-engine widebody jet airliner

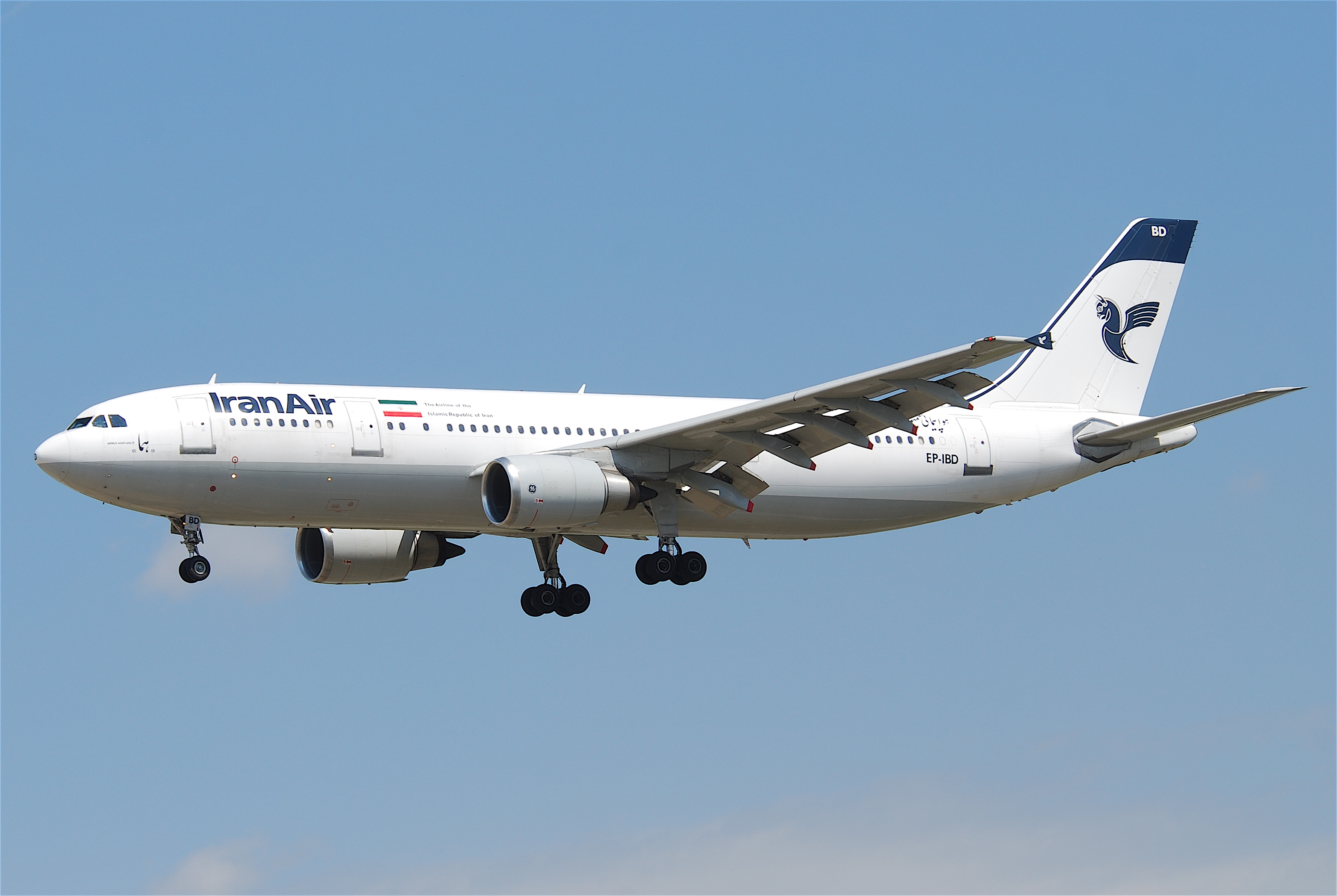
- An A300 operated by Iran Air in 2011, its largest remaining passenger operator as of 2026

General information
- Role: Wide-body airliner
- National origin: Multi-national (Note: Final assembly in France.)
- Manufacturer: Airbus
- Status: In limited passenger service, in cargo service
- Primary users: FedEx Express: UPS Airlines; European Air Transport Leipzig; Iran Air
- Number built: 561

History
- Manufactured: 1971–2007
- Introduction date: 23 May 1974 with Air France
- First flight: 28 October 1972; 54 years ago
- Developed into: Airbus A310; Airbus A330; Airbus A340; A300-600ST Beluga

The Airbus A300 is Airbus' first production aircraft and the world's first twin-engine, wide-body airliner. It was developed by Airbus Industrie GIE, now merged into Airbus, and manufactured from 1971 to 2007.

In September 1967, aircraft manufacturers in France, West Germany and the United Kingdom signed an initial memorandum of understanding to collaborate to develop an innovative large airliner. The French and West Germans reached a firm agreement on 29 May 1969, after the British withdrew from the project on 10 April 1969. A new collaborative aerospace company, Airbus Industrie GIE, was formally created on 18 December 1970 to develop and produce it. The A300 prototype first flew on 28 October 1972.

The first twin-engine widebody airliner, the A300 typically seats 247 passengers in two classes over a range of 5,375 to 7,500 km (2,902 to 4,050 nmi; 3,340 to 4,660 mi). Initial variants are powered by General Electric CF6-50 or Pratt & Whitney JT9D turbofans and have a three-crew flight deck. The improved A300-600 has a two-crew cockpit and updated CF6-80C2 or PW4000 engines; it made its first flight on 8 July 1983 and entered service later that year. The A300 is the basis of the smaller A310 (first flown in 1982) and was adapted in a freighter version. Its cross section was retained for the larger four-engined A340 (1991) and the larger twin-engined A330 (1992). It is also the basis for the oversize Beluga transport (1994). It has a yoke and does not use a fly-by-wire system found in later Airbus types.

Launch customer Air France introduced the type on 23 May 1974. After limited demand initially, sales took off as the type was proven in early service, beginning three decades of steady orders. It has a similar capacity to the Boeing 767-300, introduced in 1986, but lacked the 767-300ER's range. During the 1990s, the A300 became popular with cargo aircraft operators, as both passenger airliner conversions and as original builds. Production ceased in July 2007 after 561 deliveries. As of December 2025, there are 209 A300 family aircraft still in commercial service.

== Development ==
=== Origins ===
In 1966, Hawker Siddeley, Nord Aviation, and Breguet Aviation proposed the 260-seat wide-body HBN 100 with a similar configuration

During the 1960s, European aircraft manufacturers such as Hawker Siddeley and the British Aircraft Corporation, based in the UK, and Sud Aviation of France, had ambitions to build a new 200-seat airliner for the growing civil aviation market. While studies were performed and considered, such as a stretched twin-engine variant of the Hawker Siddeley Trident and an expanded development of the British Aircraft Corporation (BAC) One-Eleven, designated the BAC Two-Eleven, it was recognized that if each of the European manufacturers were to launch similar aircraft into the market at the same time, neither would achieve sales volume needed to make them viable. In 1965, a British government study, known as the Plowden Report, had found British aircraft production costs to be between 10% and 20% higher than American counterparts due to shorter production runs, which was in part due to the fractured European market. To overcome this factor, the report recommended the pursuit of multinational collaborative projects between the region's leading aircraft manufacturers.

European manufacturers were keen to explore prospective programmes; the proposed 260-seat wide-body HBN 100 between Hawker Siddeley, Nord Aviation, and Breguet Aviation being one such example. National governments were also keen to support such efforts amid a belief that American manufacturers could dominate the European Economic Community; in particular, Germany had ambitions for a multinational airliner project to invigorate its aircraft industry, which had declined considerably following the Second World War. During the mid-1960s, both Air France and American Airlines had expressed interest in a short-haul twin-engine wide-body aircraft, indicating a market demand for such an aircraft to be produced. In July 1967, during a high-profile meeting between French, German, and British ministers, an agreement was made for greater cooperation between European nations in the field of aviation technology, and "for the joint development and production of an airbus". The word airbus at this point was a generic aviation term for a larger commercial aircraft, and was considered acceptable in multiple languages, including French.

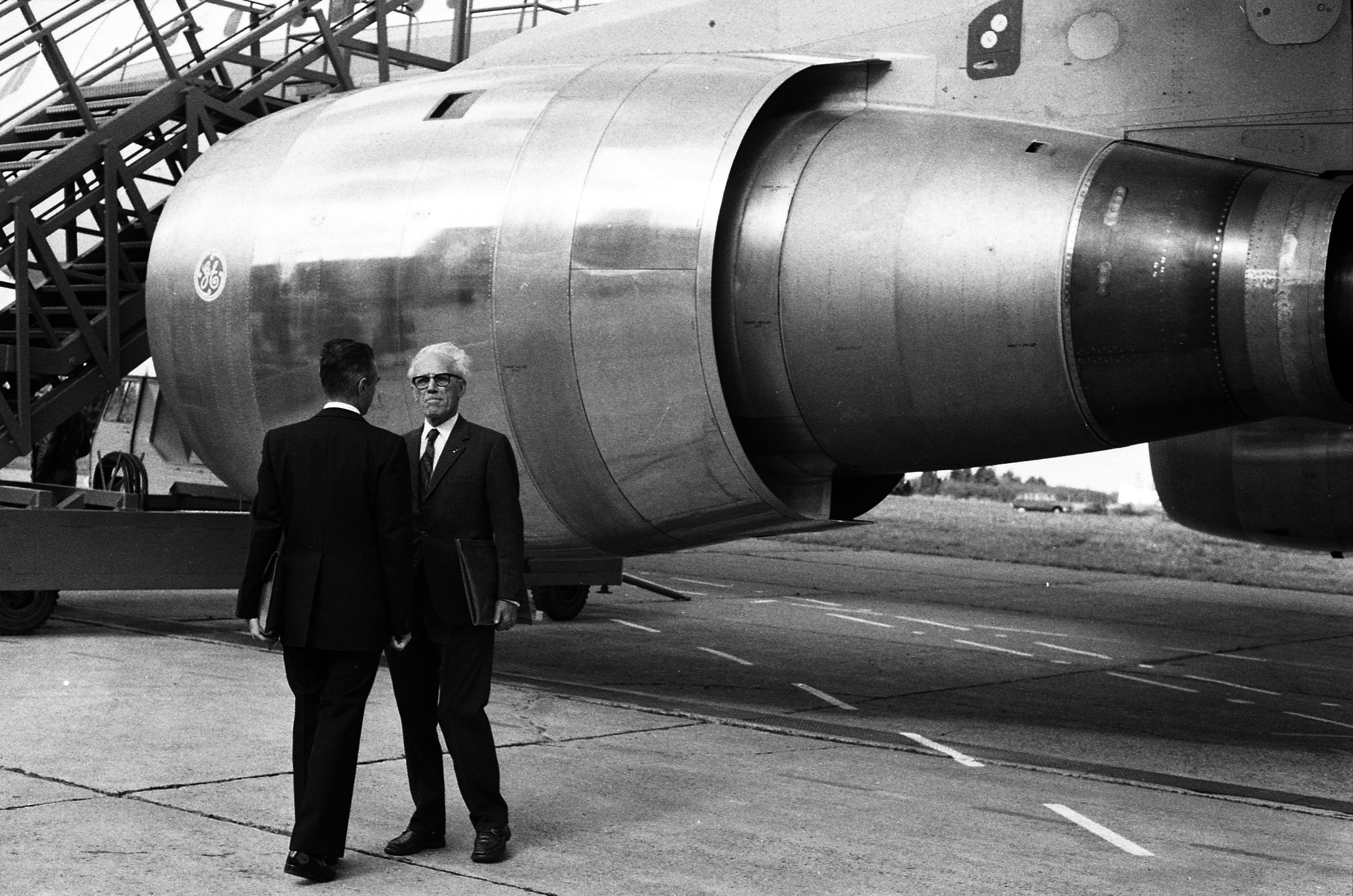
Technical director Roger Béteille (from behind) discussing with general manager Henri Ziegler beside the CF6 turbofan, which powered the A300 first flight

Shortly after the July 1967 meeting, French engineer Roger Béteille was appointed as the technical director of what would become the A300 programme, while Henri Ziegler, chief operating office of Sud Aviation, was appointed as the general manager of the organisation and German politician Franz Josef Strauss became the chairman of the supervisory board. Béteille drew up an initial work share plan for the project, under which French firms would produce the aircraft's cockpit, the control systems, and lower-centre portion of the fuselage, Hawker Siddeley would manufacture the wings, while German companies would produce the forward, rear and upper part of the center fuselage sections. Additional work included moving elements of the wings being produced in the Netherlands, and Spain producing the horizontal tail plane.

An early design goal for the A300 that Béteille had stressed the importance of was the incorporation of a high level of technology, which would serve as a decisive advantage over prospective competitors. For this reason, the A300 would feature the first use of composite materials of any passenger aircraft, the leading and trailing edges of the tail fin being composed of glass fibre reinforced plastic. Béteille opted for English as the working language for the developing aircraft, as well against using metric instrumentation and measurements, as most airlines already had US-built aircraft. These decisions were partially influenced by feedback from various airlines, such as Air France and Lufthansa, as an emphasis had been placed on determining the specifics of what kind of aircraft that potential operators were seeking. According to Airbus, this cultural approach to market research had been crucial to the company's long-term success.

=== Workshare and redefinition ===
On 26 September 1967, the French, West German and British governments signed a Memorandum of Understanding to start the development of the 300-seat Airbus A300. At this point, the A300 was only the second major joint aircraft programme in Europe, the first being the Anglo-French Concorde. Under the terms of the memorandum, the French and British were to each receive a 37.5 per cent work share on the project, while the West Germans would receive a 25 per cent share. Sud Aviation was recognized as the lead contractor for the A300, with Hawker Siddeley being selected as the British partner company. At the time, the news of the announcement had been clouded by the British Government's support for the Airbus, which coincided with its refusal to back BAC's proposed competitor, the BAC 2–11, despite a preference for the latter expressed by British European Airways (BEA). Another parameter was the requirement for a new engine to be developed by Rolls-Royce to power the proposed airliner; a derivative of the in-development Rolls-Royce RB211, the triple-spool RB207, capable of producing of 47,500 lbf (211 kN). The programme cost was US$4.6 billion (in 1993 dollars, equivalent to $9.24 billion in 2025).

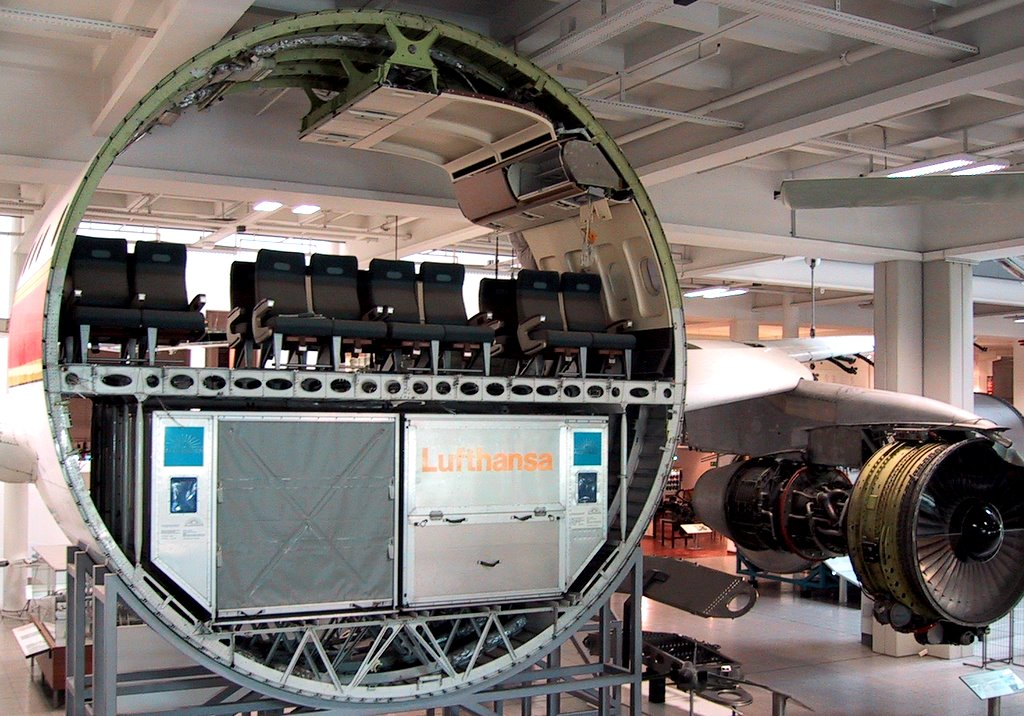
The 5.64 m (222 in) diameter circular fuselage section for 8-abreast seating and 2 LD3 containers below. This is part of the first A300 prototype, F-OCAZ, on display at Deutsches Museum in Munich.

In December 1968, the French and British partner companies (Sud Aviation and Hawker Siddeley) proposed a revised configuration, the 250-seat Airbus A250. It had been feared that the original 300-seat proposal was too large for the market, thus it had been scaled down to produce the A250. The dimensional changes involved in the shrink reduced the length of the fuselage by 5.62 metres (18.4 ft) and the diameter by 0.8 metres (31 in), reducing the overall weight by 25 tonnes (55,000 lb). For increased flexibility, the cabin floor was raised so that standard LD3 freight containers could be accommodated side-by-side, allowing more cargo to be carried. Refinements made by Hawker Siddeley to the wing's design provided for greater lift and overall performance; this gave the aircraft the ability to climb faster and attain a level cruising altitude sooner than any other passenger aircraft. It was later renamed the A300B.

Perhaps the most significant change of the A300B was that it would not require new engines to be developed, being of a suitable size to be powered by Rolls-Royce's RB211, or alternatively the American Pratt & Whitney JT9D and General Electric CF6 powerplants; this switch was recognized as considerably reducing the project's development costs. To attract potential customers in the US market, it was decided that General Electric CF6-50 engines would power the A300 in place of the British RB207; these engines would be produced in co-operation with French firm Snecma. By this time, Rolls-Royce had been concentrating their efforts upon developing their RB211 turbofan engine instead and progress on the RB207's development had been slow for some time, the firm having suffered due to funding limitations, both of which had been factors in the engine switch decision.

On 10 April 1969, a few months after the decision to drop the RB207 had been announced, the British government announced that they would withdraw from the Airbus venture. In response, West Germany proposed to France that they would be willing to contribute up to 50% of the project's costs if France was prepared to do the same. Additionally, the managing director of Hawker Siddeley, Sir Arnold Alexander Hall, decided that his company would remain in the project as a favoured sub-contractor, developing and manufacturing the wings for the A300, which would prove to be an important contributor to the performance of subsequent versions. Hawker Siddeley spent £35 million of its own funds, along with a further £35 million loan from the West German government, on the machine tooling to design and produce the wings.

=== Programme launch ===
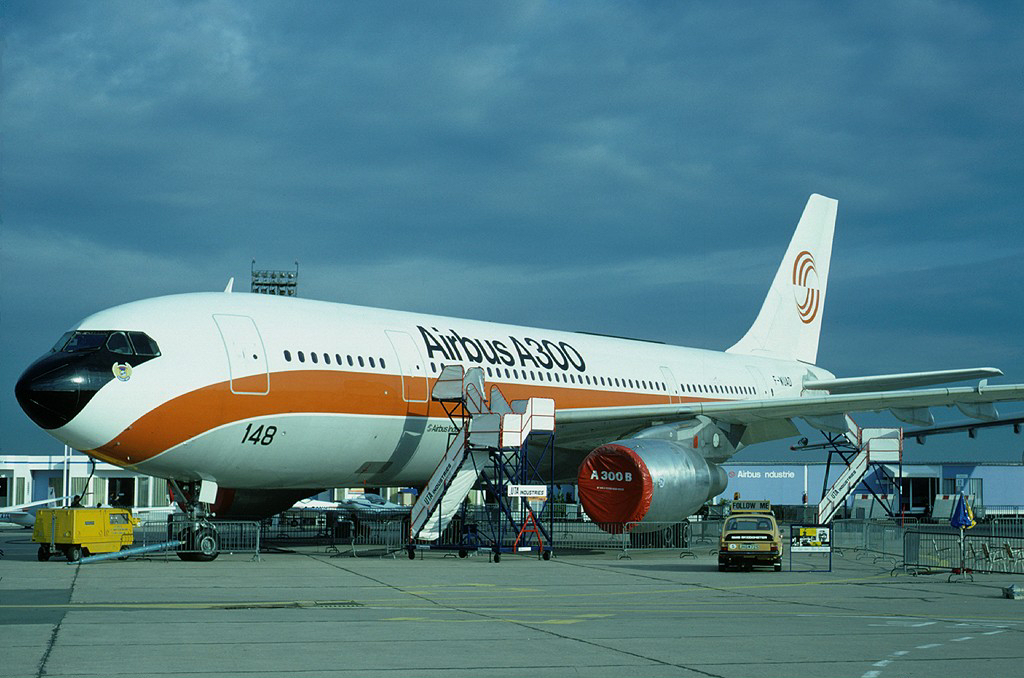
An A300 in vintage Airbus livery, it was rolled out on 28 September 1972

On 29 May 1969, during the Paris Air Show, French transport minister Jean Chamant and German economics minister Karl Schiller signed an agreement officially launching the Airbus A300, the world's first twin-engine widebody airliner. The intention of the project was to produce an aircraft that was smaller, lighter, and more economical than its three-engine American rivals, the McDonnell Douglas DC-10 and the Lockheed L-1011 TriStar. In order to meet Air France's demands for an aircraft larger than 250-seat A300B, it was decided to stretch the fuselage to create a new variant, designated as the A300B2, which would be offered alongside the original 250-seat A300B, henceforth referred to as the A300B1. On 3 September 1970, Air France signed a letter of intent for six A300s, marking the first order to be won for the new airliner.

In the aftermath of the Paris Air Show agreement, it was decided that, in order to provide effective management of responsibilities, a Groupement d'intérêt économique would be established, allowing the various partners to work together on the project while remaining separate business entities. On 18 December 1970, Airbus Industrie was formally established following an agreement between Aérospatiale (the newly merged Sud Aviation and Nord Aviation) of France and the antecedents to Deutsche Aerospace of Germany, each receiving a 50 per cent stake in the newly formed company. In 1971, the consortium was joined by a third full partner, the Spanish firm CASA, who received a 4.2 per cent stake, the other two members reducing their stakes to 47.9 per cent each. In 1979, Britain joined the Airbus consortium via British Aerospace, which Hawker Siddeley had merged into, which acquired a 20 per cent stake in Airbus Industrie with France and Germany each reducing their stakes to 37.9 per cent.

=== Prototype and flight testing ===
Airbus Industrie was initially headquartered in Paris, which is where design, development, flight testing, sales, marketing, and customer support activities were centred; the headquarters was relocated to Toulouse in January 1974. The final assembly line for the A300 was located adjacent to Toulouse Blagnac International Airport. The manufacturing process necessitated transporting each aircraft section being produced by the partner companies scattered across Europe to this one location. The combined use of ferries and roads was used for the assembly of the first A300, however this was time-consuming and not viewed as ideal by Felix Kracht, Airbus Industrie's production director. Kracht's solution was to have the various A300 sections brought to Toulouse by a fleet of Boeing 377-derived Aero Spacelines Super Guppy aircraft, by which means none of the manufacturing sites were more than two hours away. Having the sections airlifted in this manner made the A300 the first airliner to use just-in-time manufacturing techniques, and allowed each company to manufacture its sections as fully equipped, ready-to-fly assemblies.

In September 1969, construction of the first prototype A300 began. On 28 September 1972, this first prototype was unveiled to the public, it conducted its maiden flight from Toulouse–Blagnac International Airport on 28 October that year. This maiden flight, which was performed a month ahead of schedule, lasted for one hour and 25 minutes; the captain was Max Fischl and the first officer was Bernard Ziegler, son of Henri Ziegler. In 1972, unit cost was US$17.5M. On 5 February 1973, the second prototype performed its maiden flight. The flight test programme, which involved a total of four aircraft, was relatively problem-free, accumulating 1,580 flight hours throughout. In September 1973, as part of promotional efforts for the A300, the new aircraft was taken on a six-week tour around North America and South America, to demonstrate it to airline executives, pilots, and would-be customers. Amongst the consequences of this expedition, it had allegedly brought the A300 to the attention of Frank Borman, the CEO of Eastern Airlines, one of the "big four" U.S. airlines.

=== Entry into service ===
On 15 March 1974, type certificates were granted for the A300 from both German and French authorities, clearing the way for its entry into revenue service. On 23 May 1974, Federal Aviation Administration (FAA) certification was received. The first production model, the A300B2, entered service in 1974, followed by the A300B4 one year later. Initially, the success of the consortium was poor, in part due to the economic consequences of the 1973 oil crisis, but by 1979 there were 81 A300 passenger liners in service with 14 airlines, alongside 133 firm orders and 88 options. Ten years after the official launch of the A300, the company had achieved a 26 per cent market share in terms of dollar value, enabling Airbus to proceed with the development of its second aircraft, the Airbus A310.

== Design ==
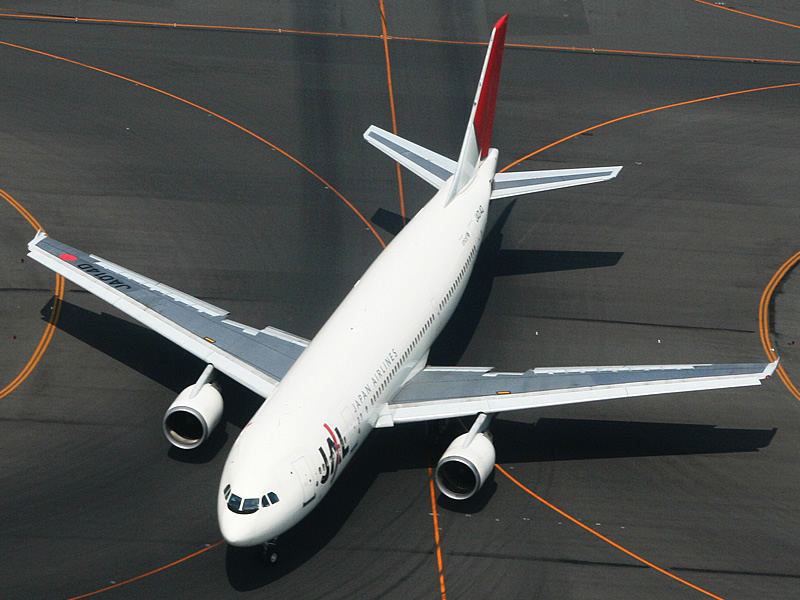
The A300 is a conventional low wing aircraft with twin underwing turbofans and a conventional tail

The Airbus A300 is a wide-body medium-to-long range airliner; it has the distinction of being the first twin-engine wide-body aircraft in the world. In 1977, the A300 became the first Extended Range Twin Operations (ETOPS)-compliant aircraft, due to its high performance and safety standards. Another world-first of the A300 is the use of composite materials on a commercial aircraft, which were used on both secondary and later primary airframe structures, decreasing overall weight and improving cost-effectiveness. Other pioneering technology included the use of centre-of-gravity control, achieved by transferring fuel between various locations across the aircraft, as first used on Concorde, and electrically signalled secondary flight controls.

The A300 is powered by a pair of underwing turbofan engines, either General Electric CF6 or Pratt & Whitney JT9D engines; the sole use of underwing engine pods allowed for any suitable turbofan engine to be more readily used. The lack of a third tail-mounted engine, as per the trijet configuration used by some competing airliners, allowed for the wings to be located further forwards and to reduce the size of the vertical stabiliser and elevator, which had the effect of increasing the aircraft's flight performance and fuel efficiency.

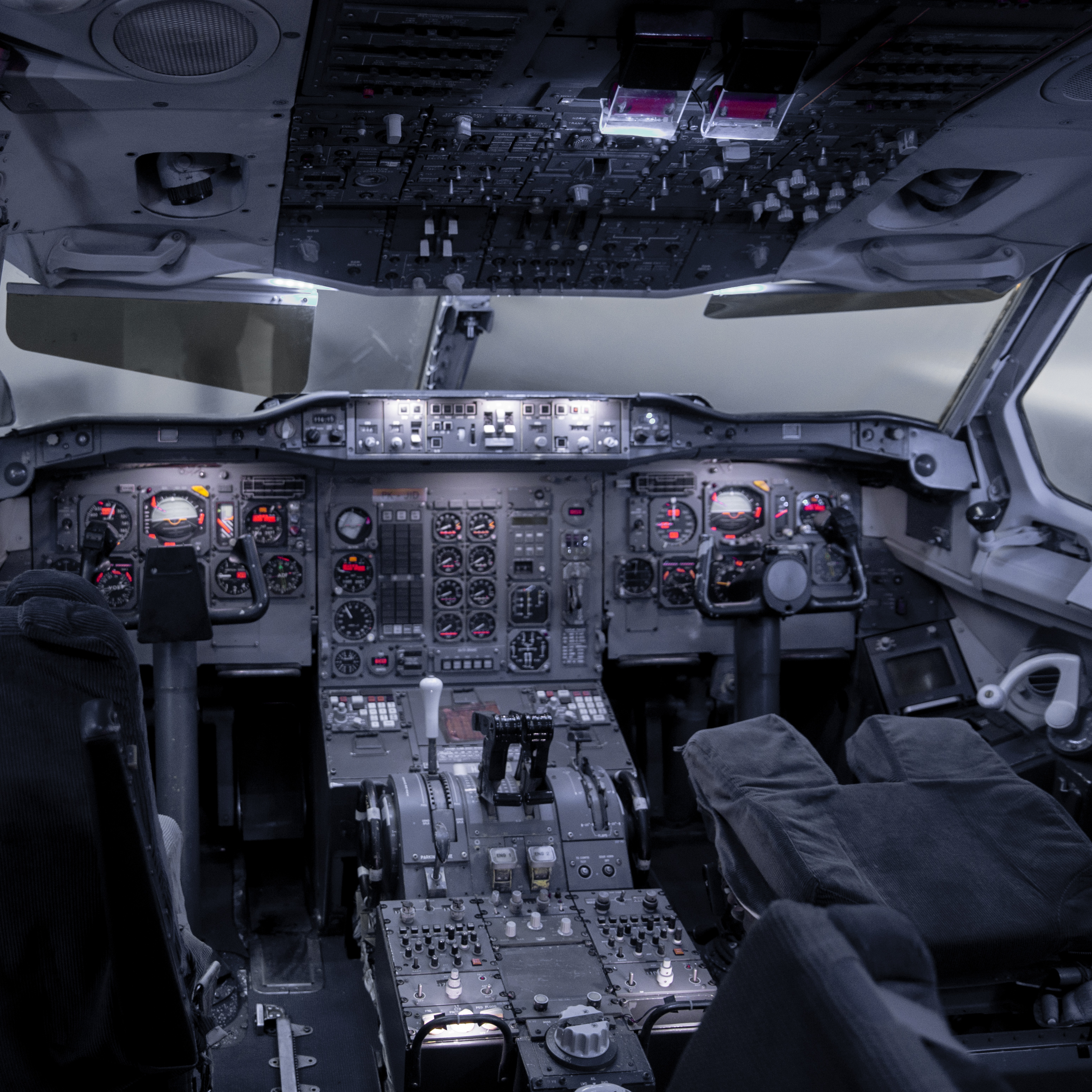
The initial A300 flight deck with analog flight instruments and a flight engineer station (not shown)

Airbus partners had employed the latest technology, some of which having been derived from Concorde, on the A300. According to Airbus, new technologies adopted for the airliner were selected principally for increased safety, operational capability, and profitability. Upon entry into service in 1974, the A300 was a very advanced plane, which went on to influence later airliner designs. The technological highlights include advanced wings by de Havilland (later BAE Systems) with supercritical airfoil sections for economical performance and advanced aerodynamically efficient flight control surfaces. The 5.64 m (222 in) diameter circular fuselage section allows an eight-abreast passenger seating and is wide enough for 2 LD3 cargo containers side by side. Structures are made from metal billets, reducing weight. It is the first airliner to be fitted with wind shear protection. Its advanced autopilots are capable of flying the aircraft from climb-out to landing, and it has an electrically controlled braking system.

Later A300s incorporated other advanced features such as the Forward-Facing Crew Cockpit (FFCC), which enabled a two-pilot flight crew to fly the aircraft alone without the need for a flight engineer, the functions of which were automated; this two-man cockpit concept was a world-first for a wide-body aircraft. Glass cockpit flight instrumentation, which used cathode ray tube (CRT) monitors to display flight, navigation, and warning information, along with fully digital dual autopilots and digital flight control computers for controlling the spoilers, flaps, and leading-edge slats, were also adopted upon later-built models. Additional composites were also made use of, such as carbon-fibre-reinforced polymer (CFRP), as well as their presence in an increasing proportion of the aircraft's components, including the spoilers, rudder, air brakes, and landing gear doors. Another feature of later aircraft was the addition of wingtip fences, which improved aerodynamic performance and thus reduced cruise fuel consumption by about 1.5% for the A300-600.

In addition to passenger duties, the A300 became widely used by air freight operators; according to Airbus, it is the best-selling freight aircraft of all time. Various variants of the A300 were built to meet customer demands, often for diverse roles such as aerial refueling tankers, freighter models (new-build and conversions), combi aircraft, military airlifter, and VIP transport. Perhaps the most visually unique of the variants is the A300-600ST Beluga, an oversized cargo-carrying model operated by Airbus to carry aircraft sections between their manufacturing facilities. The A300 was the basis for, and retained a high level of commonality with, the second airliner produced by Airbus, the smaller Airbus A310.

== Operational history ==
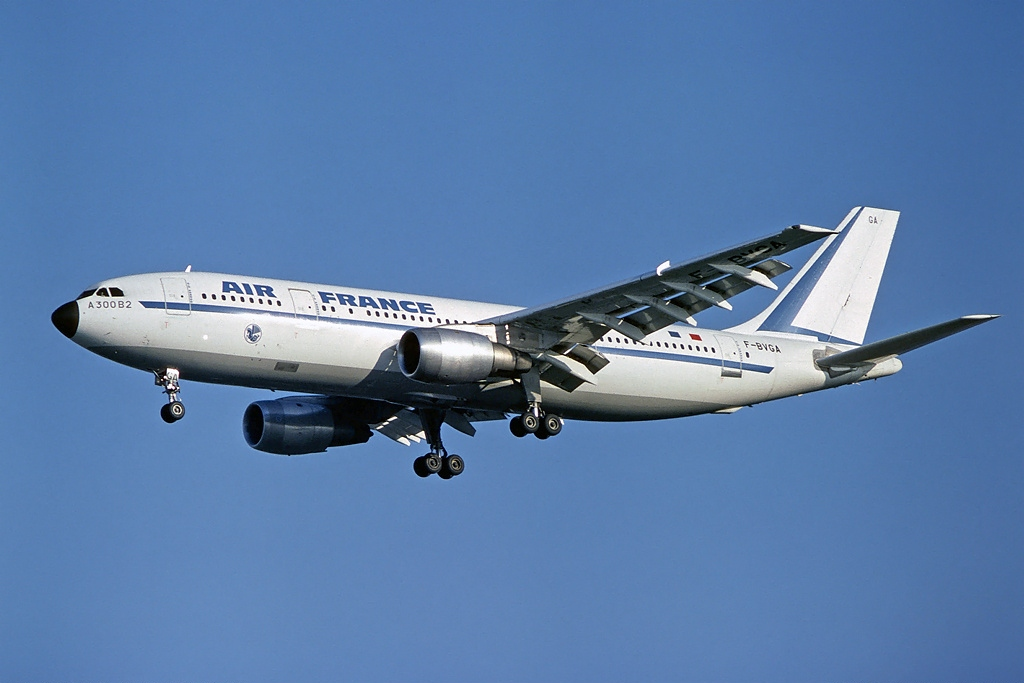
Air France introduced the A300 on 23 May 1974

On 23 May 1974, the first A300 entered commercial service, operating the type's inaugural revenue flight for Air France between Paris and London.

In the years immediately following its introduction, sales of the A300 remained limited. Most early orders came from airlines under political or industrial pressure to support domestically produced aircraft, particularly Air France and Lufthansa, which were the first two customers for the type. During the aircraft's development, many airlines had expressed interest in a wide-body aircraft optimized for short-haul operations. By the mid-1970s, however, operators found that demand on many routes was insufficient to consistently fill the larger cabins. Airlines were often forced to reduce service frequencies in an effort to improve load factors, which in turn led to the loss of passengers to competitors operating more frequent narrow-body flights. In addition, the A300's twin-engine configuration initially restricted its use on many over-water routes.

Following the appointment of Bernard Lathière as Henri Ziegler's replacement in 1975, Airbus adopted a more aggressive sales strategy. Despite this, between December 1975 and May 1977 no new orders were secured. During this period, a number of "whitetail" A300s—completed but unsold aircraft—were stored at Toulouse, and production fell to half an aircraft per month amid calls to suspend the program entirely.

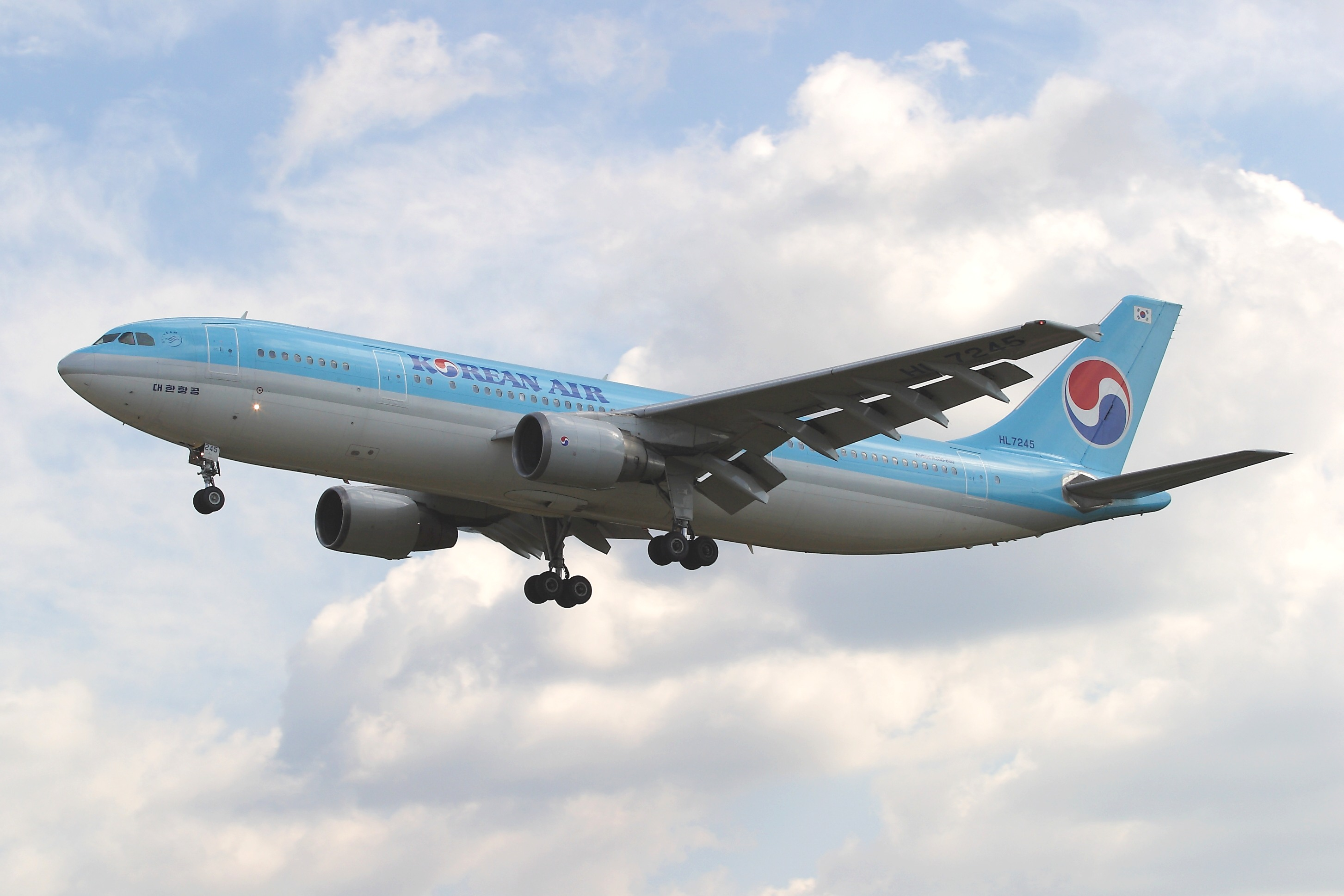
Korean Air, the first non-European customer in September 1974

During early flight testing, Airbus held discussions with Korean Air regarding the development of a longer-range version of the A300, which would become the A300B4. In September 1974, Korean Air placed an order for four A300B4s, with options for two additional aircraft, becoming the first non-European airline to order the type. This sale led Airbus to adopt what it termed the "Silk Road" strategy, identifying Southeast Asia as a key growth market. As a result, the A300 found favor with Asian airlines and was subsequently acquired by operators including Japan Air System, China Eastern Airlines, Thai Airways International, Singapore Airlines, Malaysia Airlines, Philippine Airlines, Garuda Indonesia, China Airlines, Pakistan International Airlines, Indian Airlines, Trans Australia Airlines, and others. Because Asia did not have restrictions comparable to those imposed by the U.S. Federal Aviation Administration on over-water flights by twin-engine airliners at the time, operators were able to use A300s on routes across bodies of water such as the Bay of Bengal and South China Sea.

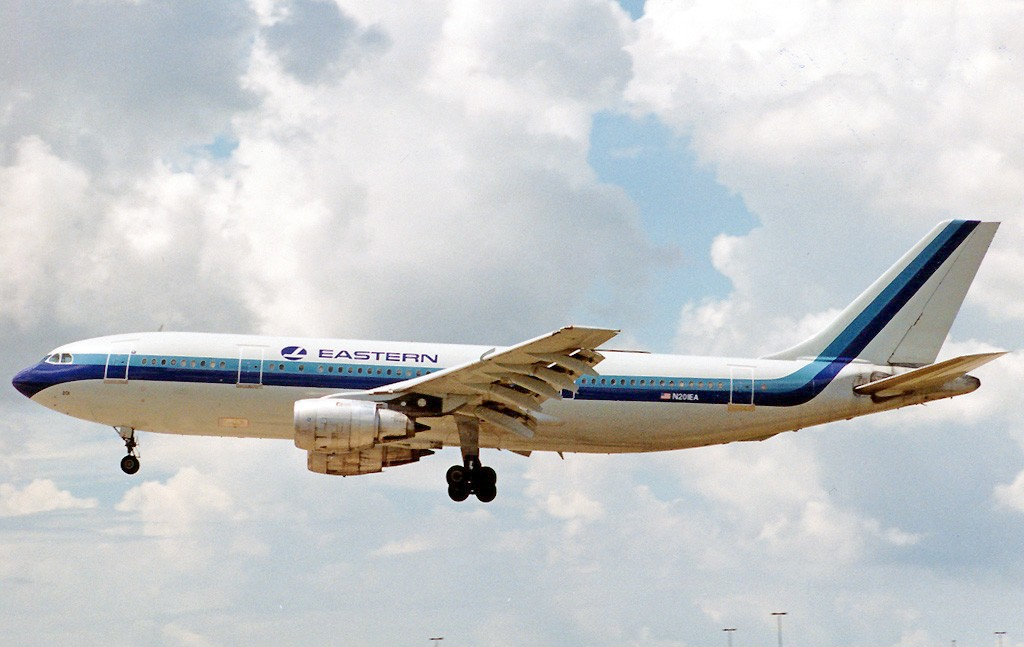
Eastern Air Lines introduced the A300 in the US market in 1977

In 1977, Airbus sought to break into the U.S. market. To demonstrate the A300's economic performance and operational suitability, Airbus provided Eastern Air Lines with four A300B4 aircraft on a six-month lease at no cost, other than crew training and routine operating expenses such as fuel. The arrangement allowed Eastern to return the aircraft at the end of the trial if it was dissatisfied with their performance. The gamble paid off: Eastern's chief executive officer, former Apollo program astronaut Frank Borman, stated that the A300 consumed 30 percent less fuel than the airline's Lockheed L-1011 TriStar fleet, exceeding expectations. Although the aircraft was larger than Eastern had originally sought, the airline concluded that it could replace its aging DC-9s and 727-100s and was capable of operating from short-runway airports while offering sufficient range for routes such as New York City–Miami. Eager to secure its first major U.S. customer, Airbus agreed to additional concessions, including loan guarantees backed by European governments and compensation for the difference between the A300's operating costs and those of a smaller 170-seat aircraft that Eastern had originally preferred. Following the trial and subsequent negotiations, Eastern placed an order for 23 A300s, becoming the first U.S. airline customer for the type and marking a major breakthrough for Airbus in the American market.

The Eastern order is often cited as the point at which Airbus came to be regarded as a serious competitor to the major American aircraft manufacturers Boeing and McDonnell Douglas. The breakthrough was shortly followed by an order from Pan Am.

Another major turning point for the program came in 1977 with the adoption of ETOPS, a revised FAA rule that allowed twin-engine jets to fly long-distance routes that had previously been off-limits. That year, the A300B4 became the first aircraft to receive ETOPS certification. This enabled Airbus to market the A300 as a transatlantic airliner. Sales were further supported by rising oil prices, which tripled between 1978 and 1981, and the A300's substantially lower fuel consumption compared with the tri- and quad-jet aircraft then in service.

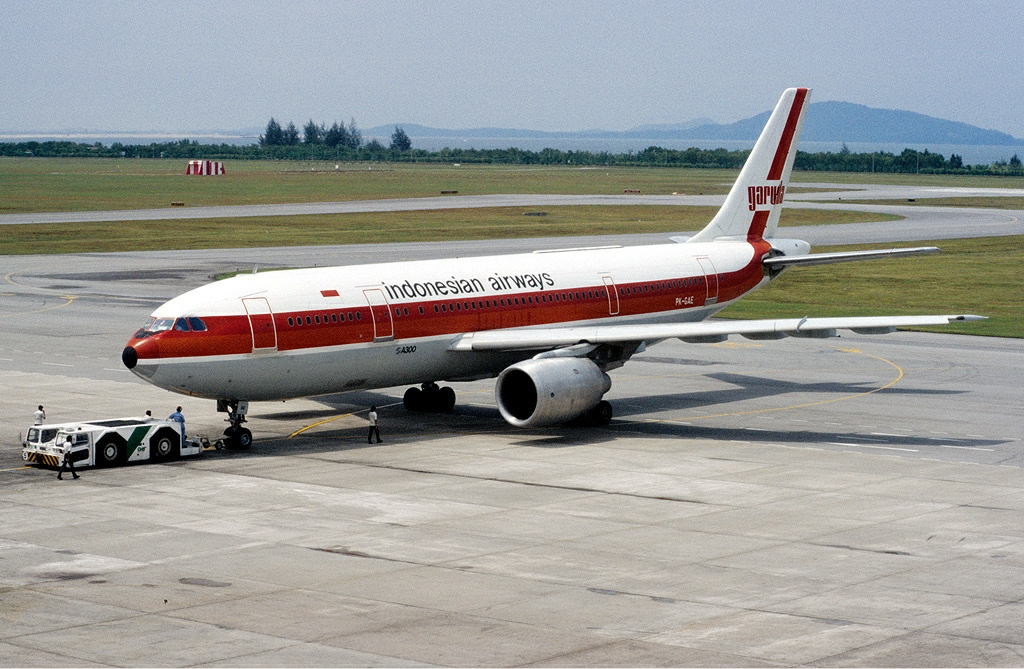
Garuda Indonesia Airbus A300 with the Forward Facing Crew Cockpit that was operated only by two-people, the first wide-body aircraft with this capability

By 1981, Airbus had grown rapidly, with more than 400 aircraft sold to over forty airlines. In 1982, Airbus introduced the Forward-Facing Crew Cockpit (FFCC) concept, making the A300 the world's first wide-body aircraft certified for operation by a two-person flight crew, further improving operating economics.

In 1984, the A300-600 entered service. Building on the FFCC concept, the new variant featured a two-crew cockpit and a number of refinements that improved efficiency, increased passenger capacity, reduced production costs, and enabled certification for 180-minute ETOPS.

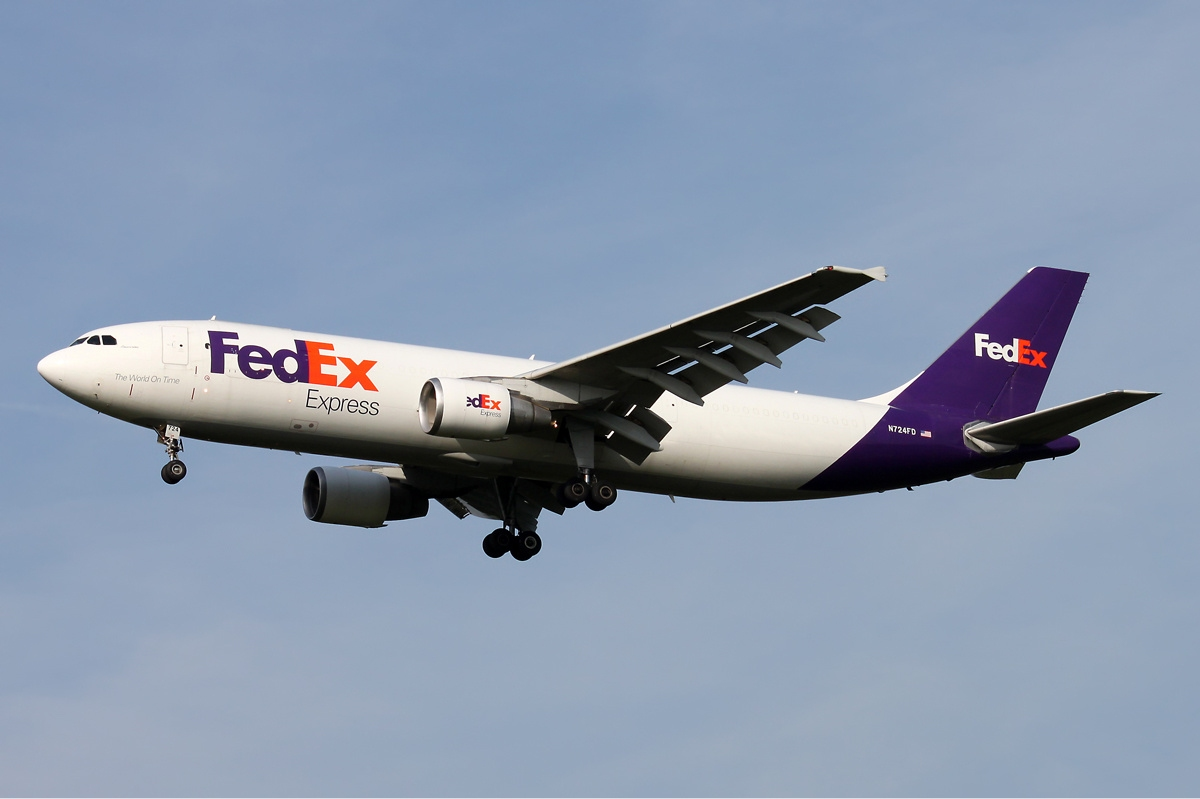
On 12 July 2007, the last A300, a freighter, was delivered to FedEx Express, the largest operator as of May 2022 with 65 aircraft still in service

By the 1990s, the A300 was being heavily promoted as a cargo freighter, with particular interest in the secondhand market for conversion to freighters. Freighter variants—either new-build A300-600s or converted ex-passenger A300s—account for most of the world's freighter fleet after the Boeing 747 freighter. The largest freight operator of the A300 is FedEx Express, which had 70 aircraft in service as of September 2022, while UPS Airlines operates 52 A300 freighters.

Despite its early challenges, the A300 family ultimately achieved commercial success, with a total of 561 aircraft delivered. The program also provided Airbus with critical experience in the competitive manufacture and marketing of commercial airliners. The basic A300 fuselage later served as the basis for several derivative aircraft, including the shortened A310, the stretched A330 and A340, and the specialized derivative Beluga transport. In March 2006, Airbus announced the impending closure of the A300/A310 final assembly line, making them the first Airbus aircraft types to be discontinued. The final production A300 was delivered to FedEx Express on 12 July 2007. Airbus subsequently announced a support package to keep A300s in commercial service and positioned the A330-200F freighter as a replacement for the A300 cargo variants.

The service life of UPS Airlines' fleet of 52 A300s, delivered between 2000 and 2006, is being extended to 2035 through a flight deck modernization program based on Honeywell Primus Epic avionics. The upgrade includes new cockpit displays and a flight management system, improved weather radar, a central maintenance system, and an updated enhanced ground proximity warning system. Given the fleet's relatively light utilization of two to three cycles per day, the aircraft are not expected to reach their maximum certified cycle limits by that time. The first modification was carried out at Airbus's Toulouse facility in 2019 and certified in 2020. As of July 2017, 211 A300s remained in service with 22 operators worldwide, with FedEx Express the largest operator, flying 68 A300-600F aircraft.

== Variants ==
=== A300B1 ===
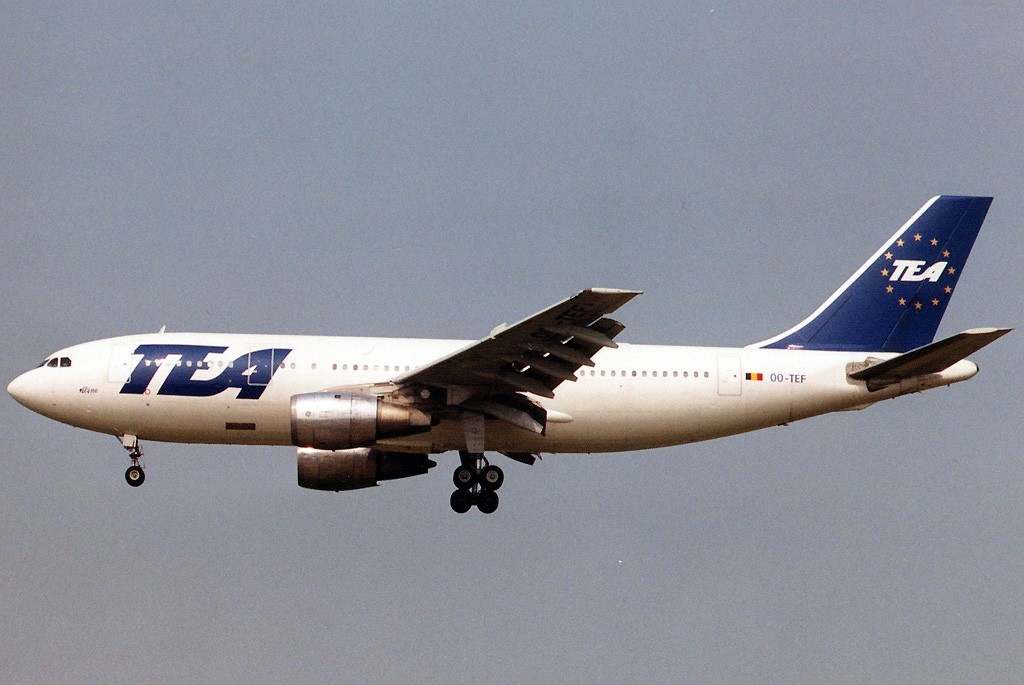
The two A300B1 prototypes were 51 m (167 ft) long

The A300B1 was the first variant to take flight. It had a maximum takeoff weight (MTOW) of 132 t (291,000 lb), was 51 m (167 ft) long and was powered by two General Electric CF6-50A engines. Only two prototypes of the variant were built before it was adapted into the A300B2, the first production variant of the airliner. The second prototype was leased to Trans European Airways in 1974.

=== A300B2 ===
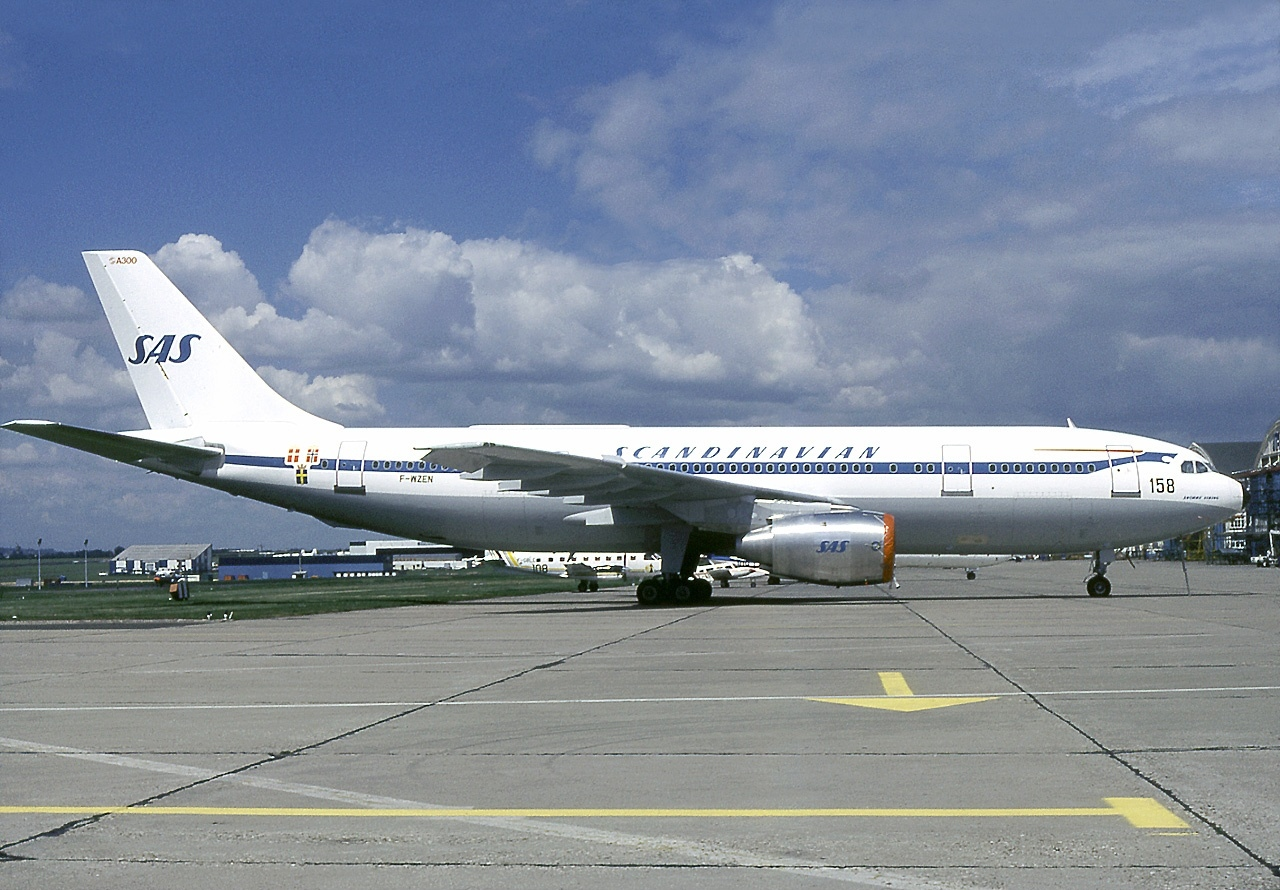
The A300B2 was 53.6 m (176 ft) long, 2.6 m (8.5 ft) longer than the A300B1

==== A300B2-100 ====
Responding to a need for more seats from Air France, Airbus decided that the first production variant should be larger than the original prototype A300B1. The CF6-50A powered A300B2-100 was 2.6 m (8.5 ft) longer than the A300B1 and had an increased MTOW of 137 t (302,000 lb), allowing for 30 additional seats and bringing the typical passenger count up to 281, with capacity for 20 LD3 containers. Two prototypes were built and the variant made its maiden flight on 28 June 1973, became certified on 15 March 1974 and entered service with Air France on 23 May 1974.

==== A300B2-200 ====
For the A300B2-200, originally designated as the A300B2K, Krueger flaps were introduced at the leading-edge root, the slat angles were reduced from 20 degrees to 16 degrees, and other lift related changes were made in order to introduce a high-lift system. This was done to improve performance when operating at high-altitude airports, where the air is less dense and lift generation is reduced. The variant had an increased MTOW of 142 t (313,000 lb) and was powered by CF6-50C engines, was certified on 23 June 1976, and entered service with South African Airways in November 1976. CF6-50C1 and CF6-50C2 models were also later fitted depending on customer requirements, these became certified on 22 February 1978 and 21 February 1980 respectively.

==== A300B2-320 ====
The A300B2-320 introduced the Pratt & Whitney JT9D powerplant and was powered by JT9D-59A engines. It retained the 142 t (313,000 lb) MTOW of the B2-200, was certified on 4 January 1980, and entered service with Scandinavian Airlines on 18 February 1980, with only four being produced.

Variant	Produced^{[A]}
B2-100	32
B2-200	25
B2-320	4

^{A} Production figures are listed up to 1 January 1999.

=== A300B4 ===
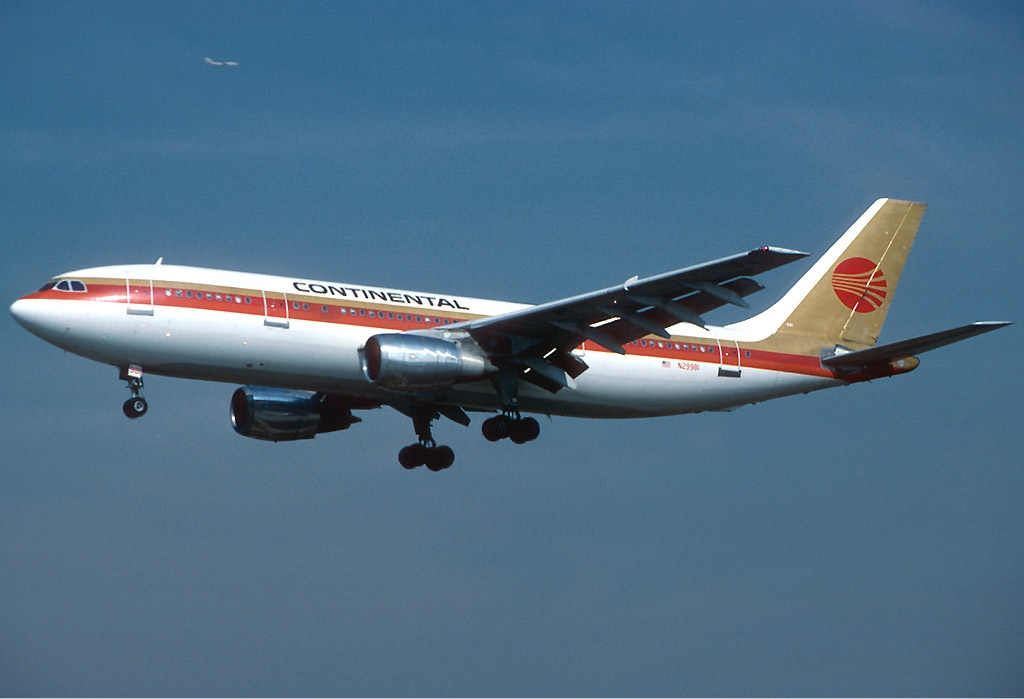
The A300B4-100 first took flight on 26 December 1974, kept the B2 length but featured a higher fuel capacity

==== A300B4-100 ====
The initial A300B4 variant, later named the A300B4-100, included a centre fuel tank for an increased fuel capacity of 47.5 tonnes (105,000 lb), and had an increased MTOW of 157.5 tonnes (347,000 lb). It also featured Krueger flaps and had a similar high-lift system to what was later fitted to the A300B2-200. The variant made its maiden flight on 26 December 1974, was certified on 26 March 1975, and entered service with Bavaria Germanair in December 1975.

==== A300B4-200 ====
The A300B4-200 had an increased MTOW of 165 tonnes (364,000 lb) and featured an additional optional fuel tank in the rear cargo hold, which would reduce the cargo capacity by two LD3 containers. The variant was certified on 26 April 1979.

Variant	Produced^{[A]}
B4-100	47
B4-200	136

^{A} Production figures are listed up to 1 January 1999.

===== A300B4-200FFCC =====
The A300B4-200 FFCC is a variant of the A300B4-200 that eliminated the flight engineer's position while retaining analog flight instruments. It incorporated the Forward-Facing Crew Cockpit (FFCC) concept, allowing the aircraft to be operated by a two-person flight crew. The type was introduced into service by Garuda Indonesian Airways in 1982 and became the world's first wide-body aircraft certified for operation without a third cockpit crew member. Finnair, SAS Airlines, and VASP subsequently ordered and operated A300 aircraft equipped with the FFCC configuration.

=== A300-600 ===
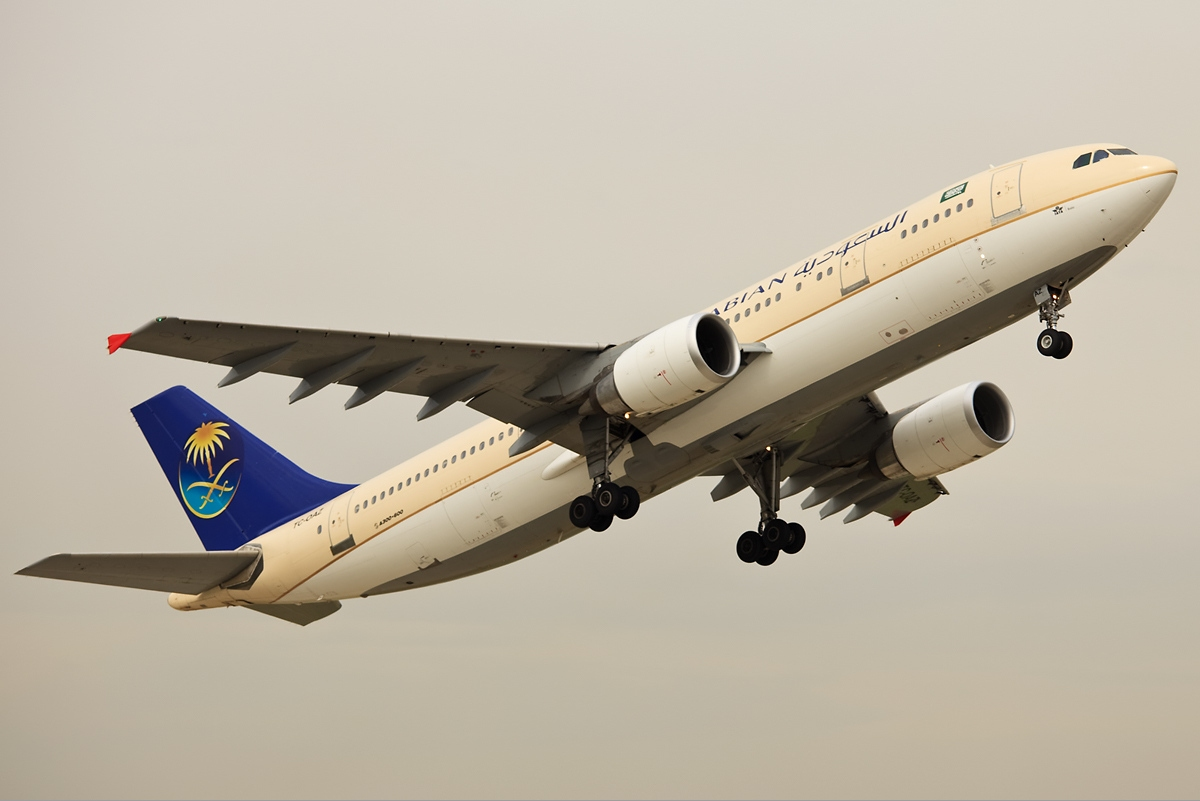
With small wingtip fences, the A300-600 entered service in June 1984 with Saudi Arabian Airlines

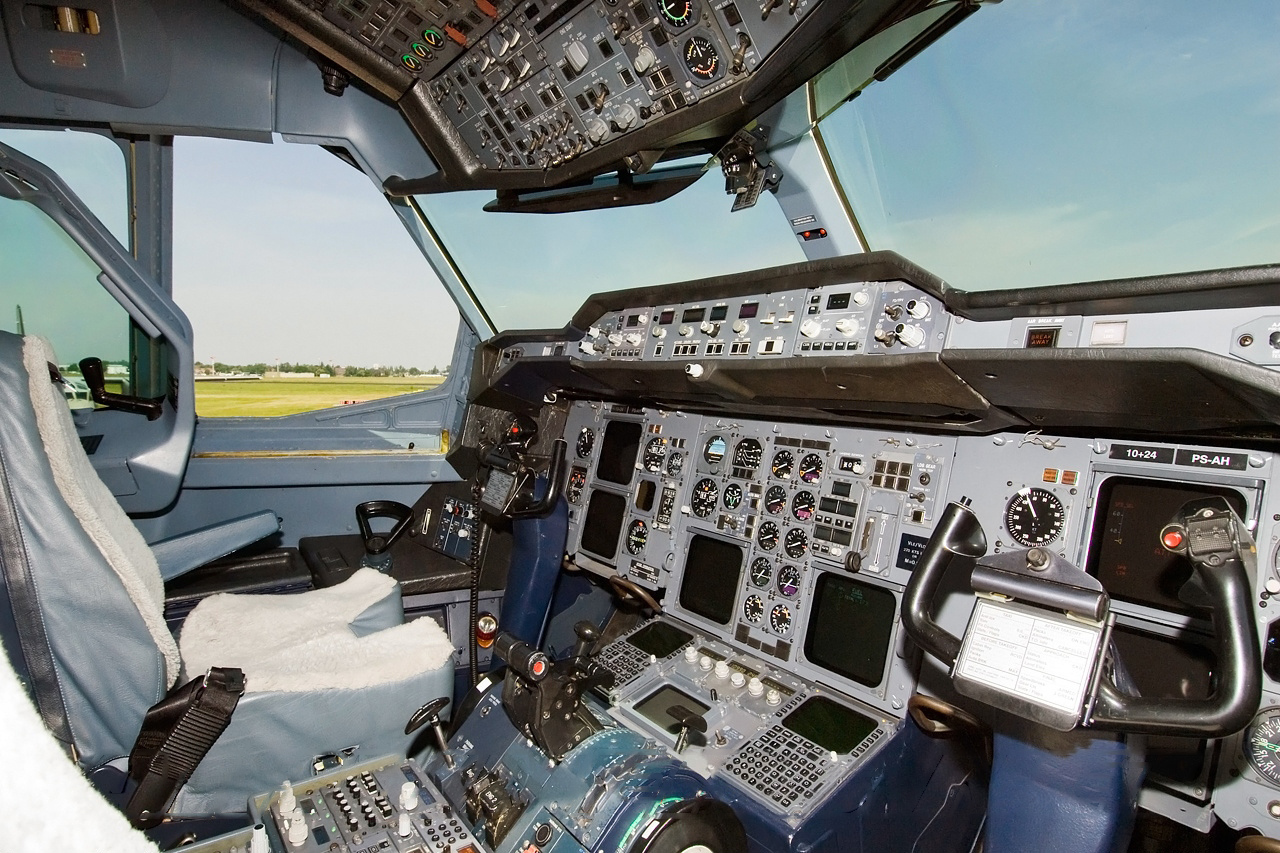
The A300-600 shared the two-crew glass cockpit with the A310

The A300-600, officially designated as the A300B4-600, was slightly longer than the A300B2 and A300B4 variants and had an increased interior space from using a similar rear fuselage to the Airbus A310; this allowed it to have two additional rows of seats. It was initially powered by Pratt & Whitney JT9D-7R4H1 engines, but was later fitted with General Electric CF6-80C2 engines, with Pratt & Whitney PW4156 or PW4158 engines being introduced in 1986. Other changes include an improved wing featuring a re-cambered trailing edge, the incorporation of simpler single-slotted Fowler flaps, the deletion of slat fences, and the removal of the outboard ailerons after they were deemed unnecessary on the A310. The variant made its first flight on 8 July 1983, was certified on 9 March 1984, and entered service in June 1984 with Saudi Arabian Airlines. A total of 313 A300-600s (all versions) have been sold. The A300-600 uses the A310's glass cockpits, featuring digital technology and electronic displays, eliminating the need for a flight engineer. The FAA issues a single type rating which allows operation of both the A310 and A300-600.

- A300-600: (Official designation: A300B4-600) The baseline model of the −600 series.
- A300-620C: (Official designation: A300C4-620) A convertible-freighter version. Four delivered between 1984 and 1985.
- A300-600F: (Official designation: A300F4-600) The freighter version of the baseline −600.
- A300-600R: (Official designation: A300B4-600R) The increased-range −600, achieved by an additional trim fuel tank in the tail. First delivery in 1988 to American Airlines (this first airframe would later crash as Flight 587); all A300s built after 1989 are −600Rs. Japan Air System (later merged into Japan Airlines) took delivery of the last newly-built -600R in November 2002.
- A300-600RC: (Official designation: A300C4-600R) The convertible-freighter version of the −600R. Two were delivered in 1999.
- A300-600RF: (Official designation: A300F4-600R) The freighter version of the −600R. All A300s delivered between November 2002 and 12 July 2007 (final A300 delivery) were -600RFs.

=== A300B10 (A310) ===
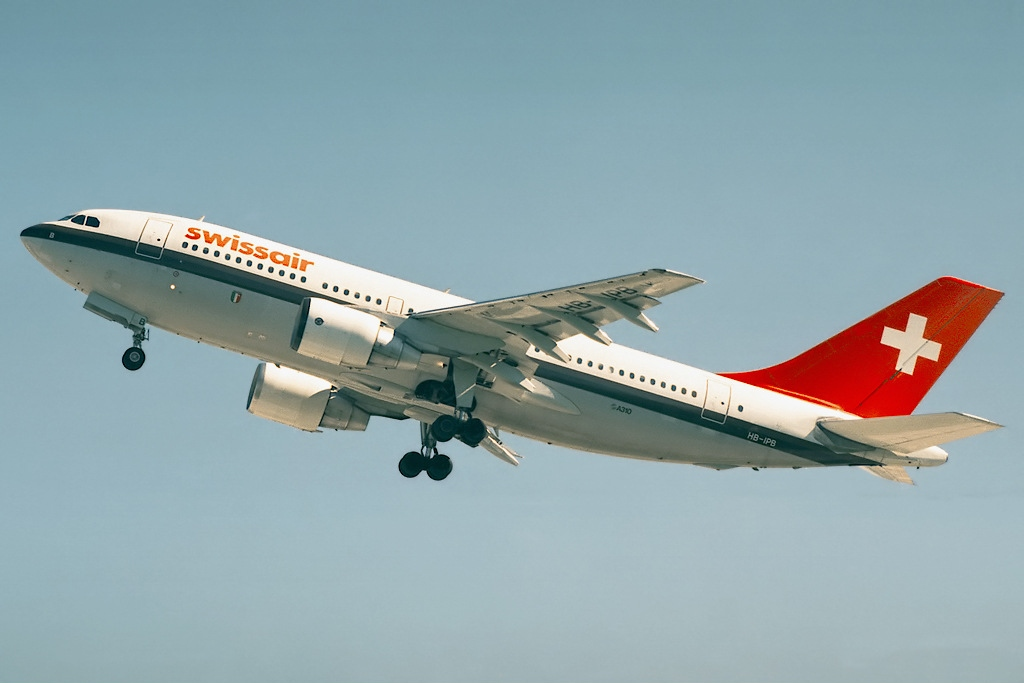
The longer-range Airbus A310, 7 m (23 ft) shorter, was introduced by Swissair in April 1983

Airbus had demand for an aircraft smaller than the A300. On 7 July 1978, the A310 (initially the A300B10) was launched with orders from Swissair and Lufthansa. On 3 April 1982, the first prototype conducted its maiden flight and it received its type certification on 11 March 1983.

Keeping the same eight-abreast cross-section, the A310 is 6.95 m (22.8 ft) shorter than the initial A300 variants, and has a smaller 219 m^{2} (2,360 sq ft) wing, down from 260 m^{2} (2,800 sq ft). The A310 introduced a two-crew glass cockpit, later adopted for the A300-600 with a common type rating. It was powered by the same GE CF6-80 or Pratt & Whitney JT9D then PW4000 turbofans. It can seat 220 passengers in two classes, or 240 in all-economy, and can fly up to 5,150 nmi (9,540 km; 5,930 mi). It has overwing exits between the two main front and rear door pairs.

In April 1983, the aircraft entered revenue service with Swissair and competed with the Boeing 767–200, introduced six months before. Its longer range and ETOPS regulations allowed it to be operated on transatlantic flights. Until the last delivery in June 1998, 255 aircraft were produced, as it was succeeded by the larger Airbus A330-200. It has cargo aircraft versions, and was derived into the Airbus A310 MRTT military tanker/transport.

=== A300-600ST ===
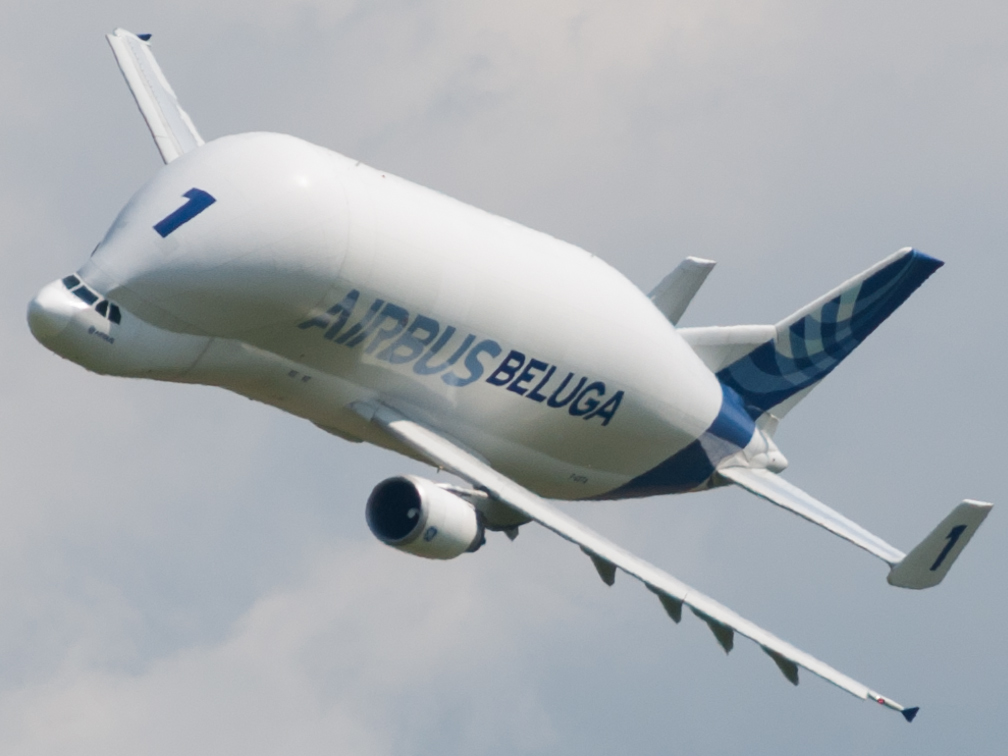
The Airbus Beluga is based on the A300 with an oversized cargo hold on top

Commonly referred to as the Airbus Beluga or "Airbus Super Transporter", these five airframes are used by Airbus to ferry parts between the company's disparate manufacturing facilities, thus enabling workshare distribution. They replaced the four Aero Spacelines Super Guppys previously used by Airbus.

ICAO code: A3ST

== Operators ==
As of April 2025, there are 209 A300 family aircraft in commercial service. The five largest operators are FedEx Express (63), UPS Airlines (52), European Air Transport Leipzig (25), Iran Air (8), and Mahan Air (8).

=== Deliveries ===
	Total	2007	2006	2005	2004	2003	2002	2001	2000	1999	1998	1997	1996	1995	1994	1993	1992	1991
Deliveries	561	6	9	9	12	8	9	11	8	8	13	6	14	17	23	22	22	25

	1990	1989	1988	1987	1986	1985	1984	1983	1982	1981	1980	1979	1978	1977	1976	1975	1974
Deliveries	19	24	17	11	10	16	19	19	46	38	39	26	15	15	13	8	4

Data through end of December 2007.

== Accidents and incidents ==
As of June 2021, the A300 has been involved in 77 occurrences including 24 hull-loss accidents causing 1133 fatalities, and 36 criminal occurrences and hijackings causing 302 fatalities.

=== Accidents with fatalities ===
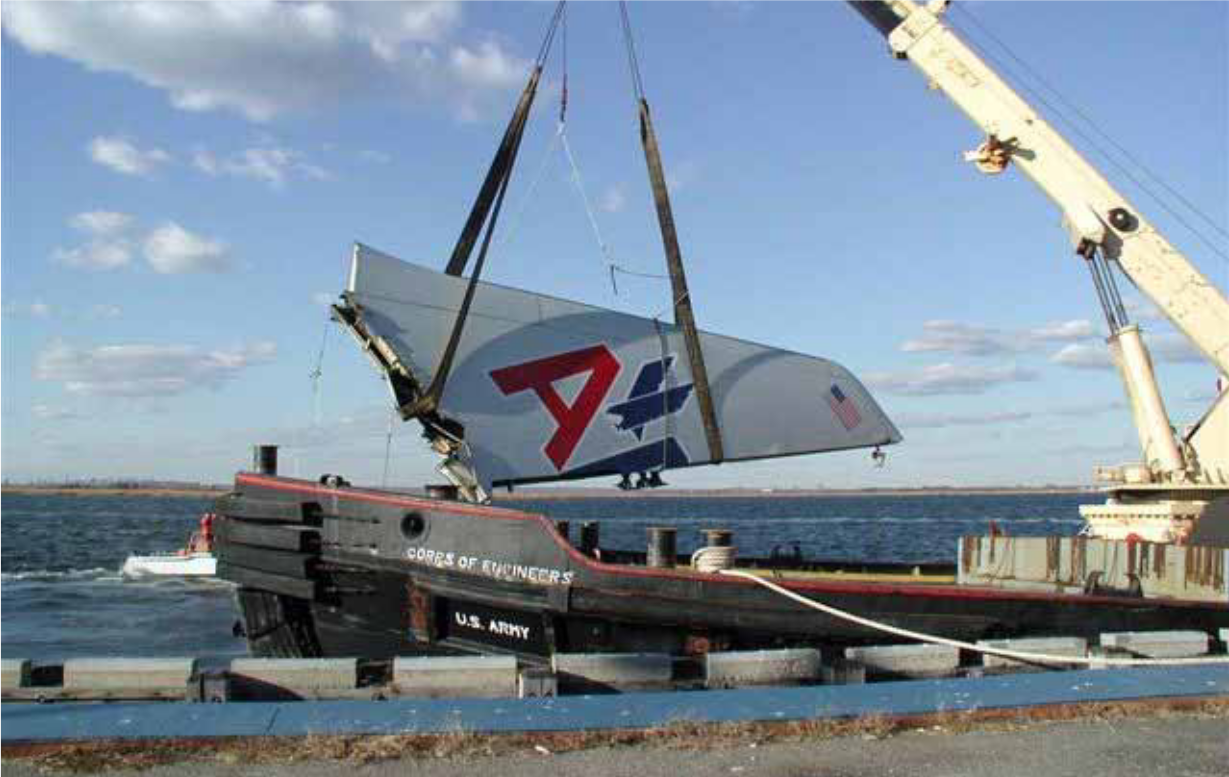
American Airlines Flight 587 vertical stabilizer

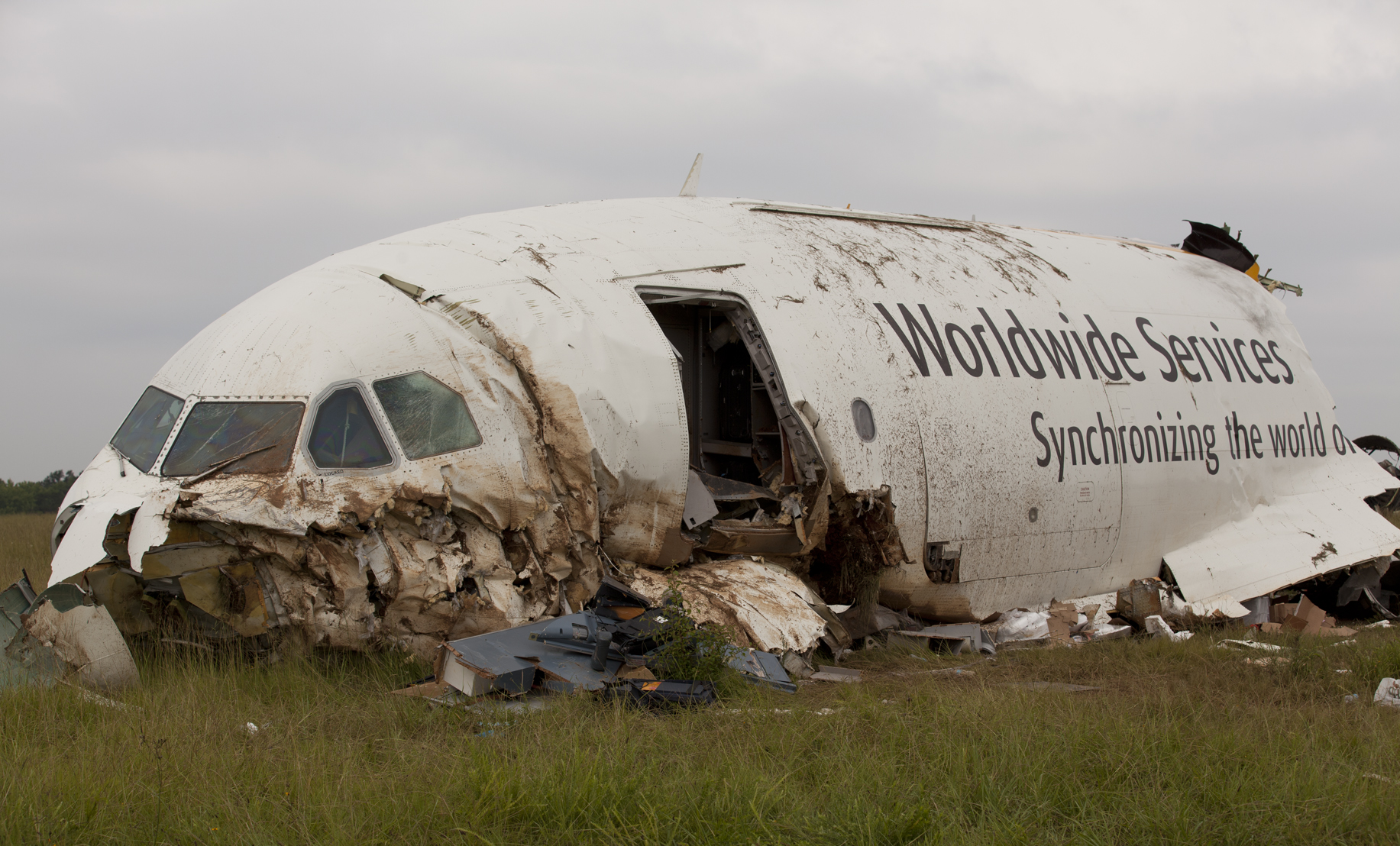
Nose and forward section of UPS 1354 which crashed in August 2013

- 21 September 1987: At Luxor Airport, Egypt, an Egyptair Airbus A300B4-203, registration SU-BCA, touched down 700 m (2,300 ft) past the runway threshold during a training flight. The right main gear hit the runway lights and the aircraft collided with an antenna and fences. No passengers were on board the plane, but 5 crew members were killed. The aircraft was written off. This was the first fatal accident of an Airbus A300.
- 28 September 1992: An A300B4-203, registration AP-BCP, operating PIA Flight 268 crashed during approach, 18km S. of Kathmandu-Tribhuvan Airport, Nepal. All 12 crew members and all 155 passengers died.
- 26 April 1994: China Airlines Flight 140, an Airbus A300B4-622R, registration B-1816, crashed upon losing control during an attempted go-around at Nagoya-Komaki Airport, Japan, killing all 15 crew and 249 of 256 passengers on board.
- 26 September 1997: An Airbus A300B4-220, registration PK-GAI, operating Garuda Indonesia Flight 152 collided with hilly terrain on approach to Medan-Polonia International Airport, as the consequence of an air-traffic control error and limited ground visibility due to the 1997 Southeast Asian haze. All 234 persons aboard were killed in Indonesia's deadliest crash to-date.
- 16 February 1998: China Airlines Flight 676 an Airbus A300B4-622R, registration B-1814, stalled and impacted a residential area of Taipei during an attempted go around at Taipei-Chiang Kai Shek Airport, Taiwan. All 196 people on board were killed, including Taiwan's central bank president. Six people on the ground were also killed.
- 2 February 2000: While being towed to a hangar at Tehran-Mehrabad Airport, an Iran Air Airbus A300B2-203 (EP-IBR) was impacted by an Iranian Air Force Lockheed C-130 Hercules transport plane that had lost directional control and veered off the runway while attempting to take off. All 8 of the Hercules' occupants were killed and both aircraft were destroyed by fire.
- 12 November 2001: An Airbus A300B4-605R, registration N14053, operating American Airlines Flight 587 crashed into Belle Harbor, a neighbourhood in Queens, New York, USA, shortly after takeoff from John F. Kennedy International Airport. The vertical stabiliser separated from the aircraft after the rudder was mishandled while encountering wake turbulence created by the Boeing 747 that had immediately preceded 587's own departure. All 260 of the plane's occupants and 5 persons on the ground were killed. It is the second-deadliest accident involving an A300 to date and the second-deadliest aircraft accident in the United States.
- 14 April 2010: AeroUnion Flight 302, an A300B4-203F, crashed on a road 2 km (1.2 mi) short of the runway while attempting to land at Monterrey Airport in Mexico. Six people (five crew members and one on the ground) were killed.
- 14 August 2013: UPS Flight 1354, an Airbus A300F4-622R, crashed outside the perimeter fence on approach to Birmingham–Shuttlesworth International Airport in Birmingham, Alabama, United States. Both crew members died.

=== Non-fatal hull losses ===
- 18 December 1983: Malaysian Airline System Flight 684, an Airbus A300B4 leased from Scandinavian Airlines System (SAS), registration OY-KAA, crashed short of the runway at Kuala Lumpur in bad weather while attempting to land on a flight from Singapore. All 247 people aboard escaped unharmed but the aircraft was destroyed in the resulting fire.
- 24 April 1993: an Air Inter Airbus A300B2-1C was written off after colliding with a light pole while being pushed back at Montpellier.
- 15 November 1993, an Indian Airlines Airbus A300, registered as VT-EDV, crash landed near Tirupati. There were no deaths but the aircraft was written off.
- 10 August 1994 – Korean Air Flight 2033 (Airbus A300) from Seoul to Jeju, the flight approached faster than usual to avoid potential windshear. Fifty feet above the runway the co-pilot, who was not flying the aircraft, decided that there was insufficient runway left to land and tried to perform a go-around against the captain's wishes. The aircraft touched down 1,773 meters beyond the runway threshold. The aircraft could not be stopped on the remaining 1,227 meters of runway and overran at a speed of 104 knots. After striking the airport wall and a guard post at 30 knots, the aircraft burst into flames and was incinerated. The cabin crew was credited with safely evacuating all passengers although only half of the aircraft's emergency exits were usable.
- 17 October 2001: Pakistan International Airlines flight PK231, registration AP-BCJ, from Islamabad via Peshawar to Dubai veered off the side of the runway after the right hand main landing gear collapsed as it touched down. The aircraft skidded and eventually came to rest in sand 50 meters from the runway. The aircraft sustained damage to its right wing structure and its no. 2 engine, which partly broke off the wing. All 205 passengers and crew survived.
- 1 March 2004: Pakistan International Airlines Flight 2002 burst 2 tyres whilst taking off from King Abdulaziz International Airport. Fragments of the tyre were ingested by the engines, this caused the engines to catch fire and an aborted takeoff was performed. Due to the fire substantial damage to the engine and the left wing caused the aircraft to be written off. All 261 passengers and 12 crew survived.
- 16 November 2012: an Air Contractors Airbus A300B4-203(F) EI-EAC, operating flight QY6321 on behalf of EAT Leipzig from Leipzig (Germany) to Bratislava (Slovakia), suffered a nose wheel collapse during roll out after landing at Bratislava's M. R. Štefánik Airport. All three crew members survived unharmed, the aircraft was written off. As of December 2017, the aircraft still was parked at a remote area of the airport between runways 13 and 22.
- 12 October 2015: An Airbus A300B4-200F Freighter operated by Egyptian Tristar cargo carrier crashed in Mogadishu, Somalia. All the passengers and crew members survived the crash.
- 1 October 2016: An Airbus A300-B4 registration PR-STN on a cargo flight between São Paulo-Guarulhos and Recife suffered a runway excursion after landing and the aft gear collapsed upon touchdown.

=== Violent incidents ===
- 27 June 1976: Air France Flight 139, originating in Tel Aviv, Israel and carrying 248 passengers and a crew of 12 took off from Athens, Greece, headed for Paris, France. The flight was hijacked by terrorists, and was eventually flown to Entebbe Airport in Uganda. At the airport, Israeli commandos rescued 102 of the 106 hostages.
- 3 February 1984: Serviços Aéreos Cruzeiro do Sul Flight 302, an Airbus A300B4-203, was hijacked while flying from São Luís to Belém and was forced to divert to Cuba. There were no fatalities among the 176 passengers and crew.
- 26 October 1986: Thai Airways Flight 620, an Airbus A300B4-601, originating in Bangkok suffered an explosion mid-flight. The aircraft descended rapidly and was able to land safely at Osaka. The aircraft was later repaired and there were no fatalities. The cause was a hand grenade brought onto the plane by a Japanese gangster of the Yamaguchi-gumi. 109 of the 247 people on board were injured. (Note: Attributed to multiple sources:)
- 3 July 1988: Iran Air Flight 655 was shot down by USS Vincennes in the Persian Gulf after being mistaken for an attacking Iranian F-14 Tomcat, killing all 290 passengers and crew, making it the deadliest accident involving an Airbus A300.
- 15 February 1991: two Kuwait Airways A300C4-620s and two Boeing 767s that had been seized during Iraq's occupation of Kuwait were destroyed in coalition bombing of Mosul Airport.
- 24 December 1994: Air France Flight 8969 was hijacked at Houari Boumedienne Airport in Algiers, by four terrorists who belonged to the Armed Islamic Group. The terrorists apparently intended to crash the plane over the Eiffel Tower on Boxing Day. After a failed attempt to leave Marseille following a confrontational firefight between the terrorists and the GIGN French Special Forces, the result was the death of all four terrorists. (Snipers on the terminal front's roof shot dead two of the terrorists. The other two terrorists died as a result of gunshots in the cabin after approximately 20 minutes.) Three hostages including a Vietnamese diplomat were executed in Algiers, 229 hostages survived, many of them wounded by shrapnel. The almost 15-year-old aircraft was written off.
- 24 December 1999: Indian Airlines Flight IC 814 from Kathmandu, Nepal, to New Delhi was hijacked. After refuelling and offloading a few passengers, the flight was diverted to Kandahar, Afghanistan. An Indian man was murdered while the plane was in flight.
- 22 November 2003: European Air Transport OO-DLL, operating on behalf of DHL Aviation, was hit by an SA-14 'Gremlin' missile after takeoff from Baghdad International Airport. The aeroplane lost hydraulic pressure and thus the controls. After extending the landing gear to create more drag, the crew piloted the plane using differences in engine thrust and landed the plane with minimal further damage. The plane was repaired and offered for sale, but in April 2011 it still remained parked at Baghdad Intl.
- 25 August 2011: an A300B4-620 5A-IAY of Afriqiyah Airways and A300B4-622 5A-DLZ of Libyan Arab Airlines were both destroyed in fighting between pro- and anti-Gaddafi forces at Tripoli International Airport.

== Aircraft on display ==
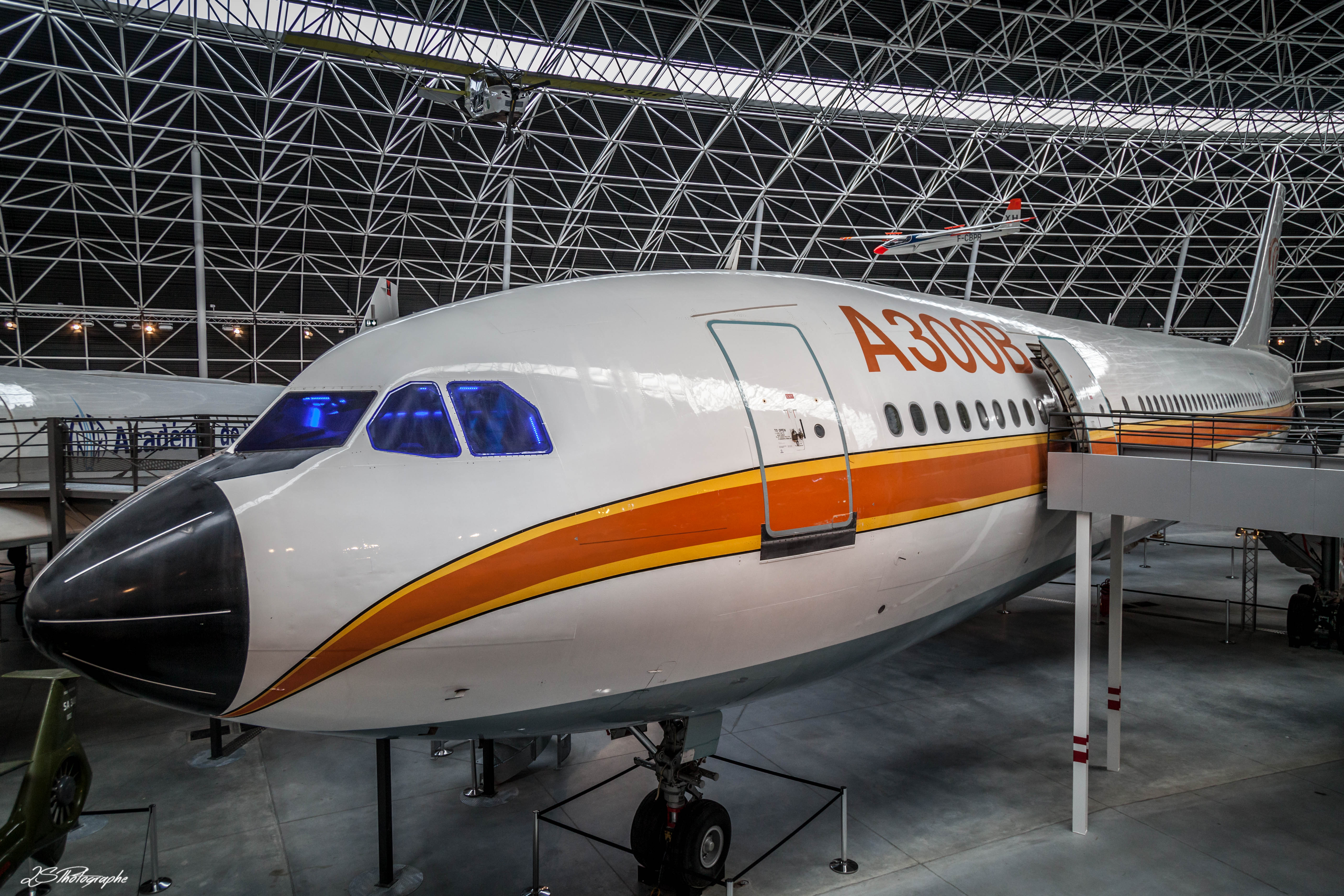
Airbus A300B4 repainted in first A300B1 prototype colours, including original F-WUAB registration, on display at Aeroscopia

Fifteen A300s are currently preserved:

- F-BUAD Airbus A300 ZERO-G, since August 2015 preserved at Cologne Bonn Airport, Germany.
- F-WUAB The first prototype of the Airbus A300 is Partially preserved with a fuselage section, the right-hand wing, and an engine on display at the Deutsches Museum
- ex-HL7219 Korean Air Airbus A300B4 preserved at Korean Air Jeongseok Airfield.
- ex-N11984 Continental Airlines Airbus A300B4 preserved in South Korea as a Night Flight Restaurant.
- ex TC-ACD and TC-ACE Air ACT, preserved as coffee house at Uçak Cafe in Burhaniye, Turkey.
- ex TC-MNJ MNG Airlines, preserved as Köfte Airlines restaurant at Tekirdağ, Turkey.
- ex TC-FLA Fly Air, preserved as the Airbus Cafe & Restaurant at Kayseri, Turkey.
- ex TC-ACC Air ACT, preserved as the Uçak Kütüphane library and education centre at Çankırı, Turkey.
- ex EP-MHA Mahan Air, preserved as instructional airframe at the Botia Mahan Aviation College at Kerman, Iran.
- ex TC-FLM Fly Air, preserved as a restaurant at Istanbul, Turkey.
- ex B-18585 China Airlines, preserved as the Flight of Happiness restaurant at Taoyuan, Taiwan.
- ex-PK-JID Sempati Air Airbus A300B4 repainted in first A300B1 prototype colours, including original F-WUAB registration, became an exhibit in 2014 at the Aeroscopia museum in Blagnac, near Toulouse, France.
- ex TC-MCE MNG Airlines, preserved as a restaurant at the Danialand theme park at Agadir, Morocco.
- ex HL7240 Korean Air, preserved as instructional airframe (gate guard) at the Korea Aerospace University at Goyang, South Korea.
- ex HS-TAM Thai Airways A300-600R, preserved in a field near Doi Saket, Chiang Mai.

== Specifications ==
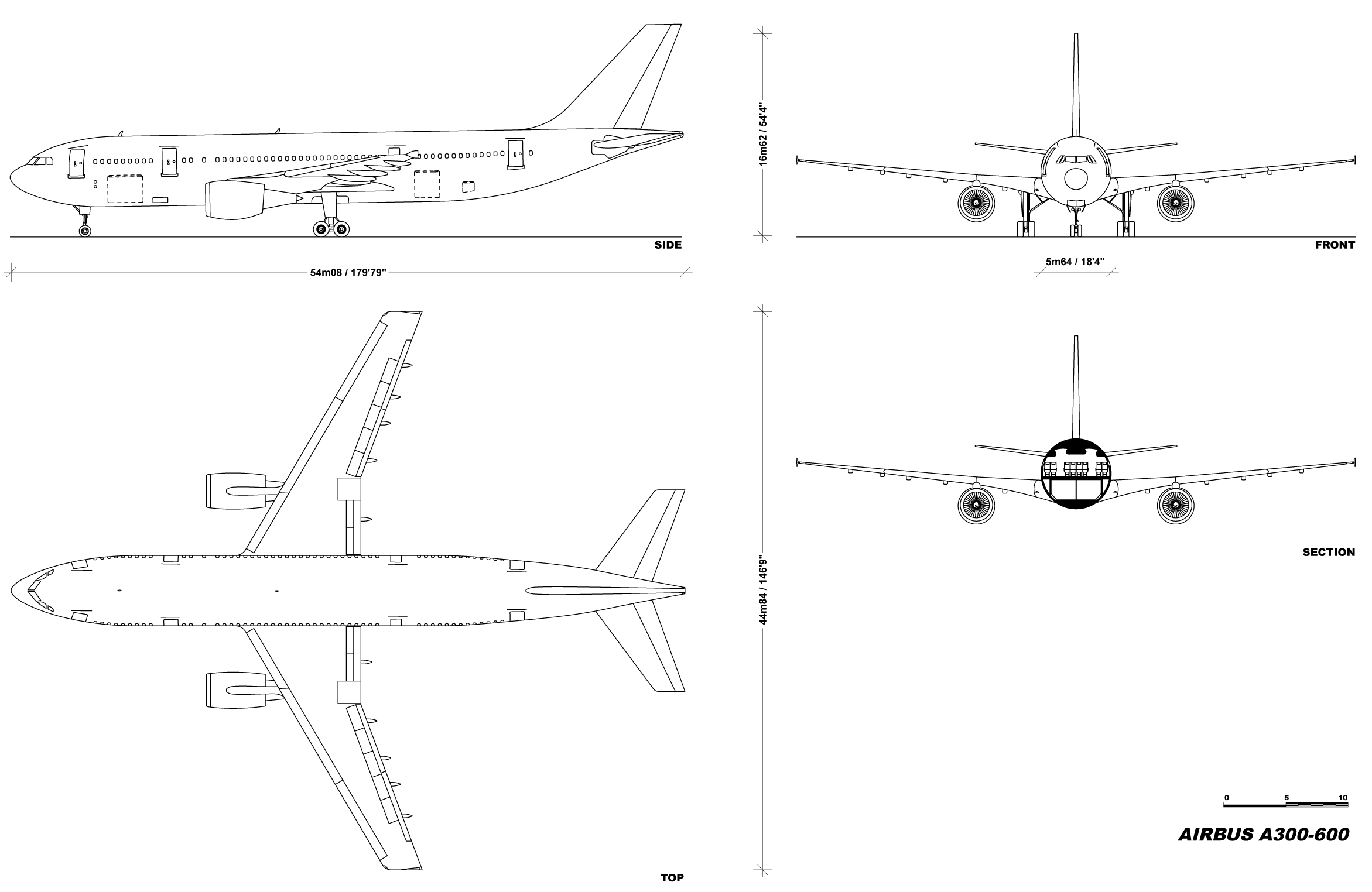

Model	A300B4-200	A300-600R	A300-600F
Cockpit crew	Three	Two	
Main deck	281/309Y @ 34/31 in) max 345	247 (46F + 201Y)/285Y @ 34 in max 345 (3-3-3 Y)	540 m^{3}, 43 AYY ULD; 9 AMJ/LD7 + 16 AYY
Lower deck	20 LD3 + bulk	22 LD3 + bulk / 158 m^{3}	
Length	53.61 m (175.9 ft)	54.08 m (177.4 ft)	
Height	16.72 m (54.9 ft)	16.66 m (54.7 ft)	
Wing	44.84 m (147.1 ft) span, 260 m^{2} (2,800 sq ft) area 7.7 aspect ratio		
Width	5.287 m (17.35 ft) cabin, 5.64 m (18.5 ft) Fuselage, usually 2-4-2Y		
Pressurized volume	542 m^{3} (19,140 cu ft)	860 m^{3} (30,370 cu ft)	
MTOW	165,000 kg (363,763 lb)	171,700 kg (378,534 lb)	170,500 kg (375,888 lb)
Max payload	37,495 kg (82,662 lb)	41,374 kg (91,214 lb)	48,293 kg (106,468 lb)
Fuel capacity	48,470 kg (106,858 lb)	53,505 kg (117,958 lb)	
OEW	88,505 kg (195,120 lb)	88,626 kg (195,387 lb)	81,707 kg (180,133 lb)
Engines	GE CF6-50C2 or PW JT9D-59A	GE CF6-80C2 or PW4158	
Takeoff thrust	230 kN (52,000 lb_{f})	249–270 kN (56,000–61,000 lb_{f})	
Takeoff (MTOW, SL, ISA)	2,300 m (7,500 ft)	2,400 m (7,900 ft)	
Speed	Mach 0.78 (450 kn; 833 km/h; 518 mph) at 35,000 ft (11 km); M_{MO}: Mach 0.82		
Range	5,375 km (2,900 nmi; 3,340 mi)	7,500 km (4,050 nmi; 4,700 mi)	

=== Aircraft model designations ===
Type Certificate Data Sheet
Model	Certification Date	Engines
A300B1	12 November 1974	GE CF6-50A
A300B1	12 November 1974	GE CF6-50C
A300B2-1A	15 March 1974	GE CF6-50A
A300B2-1C	2 October 1974	GE CF6-50C
A300B2-1C	2 October 1974	GE CF6-50C2R
A300B2K-3C	23 June 1976	GE CF6-50C
A300B2K-3C	23 June 1976	GE CF6-50C2R
A300B2-202	22 February 1978	GE CF6-50C1
A300B2-203	21 February 1980	GE CF6-50C2
A300B2-203	21 February 1980	GE CF6-50C2D
A300B2-320	4 January 1980	PW JT9D-59A
A300B4-2C	26 March 1975	GE CF6-50C
A300B4-2C	26 March 1975	GE CF6-50C2R
A300B2-102	7 December 1977	GE CF6-50C1
A300B4-103	21 March 1979	GE CF6-50C2
A300B4-103	21 March 1979	GE CF6-50C2D
A300B4-120	4 February 1981	PW JT9D-59A
A300B4-203	26 April 1979	GE CF6-50C2
A300B4-203	26 April 1979	GE CF6-50C2D
A300B4-220	8 January 1982	PW JT9D-59A
A300C4-203	18 December 1979	GE CF6-50C2
A300C4-203	6 June 1986	GE CF6-50C2
A300B4-601	17 September 1985	GE CF6-80C2A1
A300B4-603	27 January 1987	GE CF6-80C2A3
A300B4-620	9 March 1984	PW JT9D-7R4H1
A300B4-622	6 March 1989	PW4158
A300C4-620	17 May 1984	PW JT9D-7R4H1
A300B4-605R	10 March 1988	GE CF6-80C2A3
A300B4-605R	10 March 1988	GE CF6-80C2A5
A300B4-605R	10 March 1988	GE CF6-80C2A5F
A300B4-622R	25 November 1988	PW4158
A300C4-605R	2 July 1999	GE CF6-80C2A5
A300F4-605R	19 April 1994	GE CF6-80C2A5
A300F4-605R	19 April 1994	GE CF6-80C2A5F
A300F4-622R	20 June 2000	PW4158

== See also ==
- Competition between Airbus and Boeing
- F-WUAB (Airbus A300B1)

Related development

- Airbus A310
- Airbus A330
- Airbus A340
- Airbus Beluga – modified A300-600

Aircraft of comparable role, configuration, and era

- Lockheed L-1011 TriStar
- McDonnell Douglas DC-10

Related lists

- List of jet airliners
