= Thai Airways International Flight 620 =

Thai Airways flight damaged by in-flight explosion

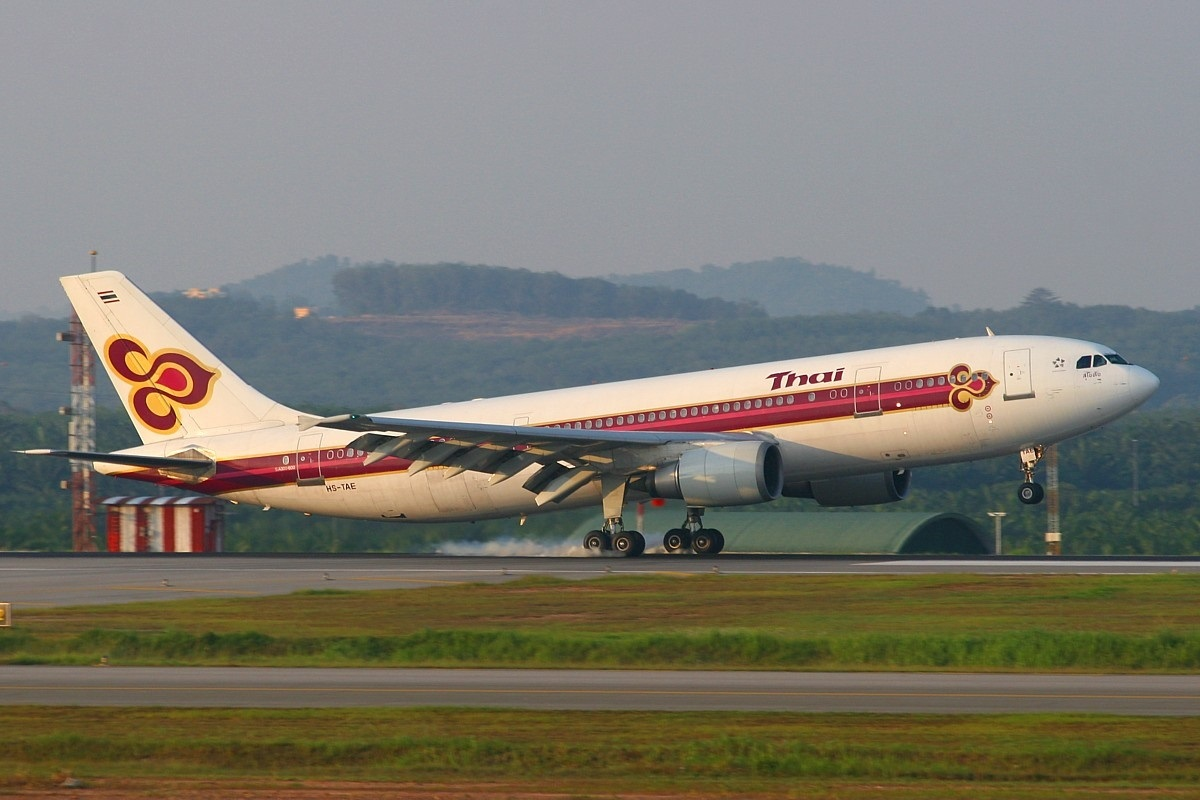
- HS-TAE, the aircraft involved, photographed in 2005

Accident
- Date: 26 October 1986
- Summary: Accidental in-flight explosion caused by smuggled hand grenade
- Site: Tosa Bay, Kochi Prefecture, Japan

Aircraft
- Aircraft type: Airbus A300B4-601
- Aircraft name: Sukhothai
- Operator: Thai Airways International
- IATA flight No.: TG620
- ICAO flight No.: THA620
- Call sign: THAI 620
- Registration: HS-TAE
- Flight origin: Don Mueang International Airport, Bangkok, Thailand
- Stopover: Manila International Airport, Manila, Philippines
- Destination: Osaka International Airport, Osaka, Japan
- Occupants: 247
- Passengers: 233
- Crew: 14
- Fatalities: 0
- Injuries: 109
- Survivors: 247

Thai Airways International Flight 620 was a scheduled Thai Airways International passenger flight from Bangkok to Osaka via Manila. On 26 October 1986, the Airbus A300 aircraft, which originated in Bangkok, suffered an explosion mid-flight due to an accidental grenade discharge; the explosive had been smuggled in by a member of the Yamaguchi-gumi yakuza gang. The aircraft landed safely at Osaka and was later repaired. 109 of the 239 people on board were injured.

== Incident ==
At around 8:00 p.m. on 26 October 1986, Flight 620 was cruising above Tosa Bay off the coast of Kochi Prefecture, carrying 14 crew members and 233 passengers, when the rear of the aircraft suddenly suffered an explosion, resulting in rapid decompression and damage to the rear pressure bulkhead, severing two of the three hydraulic pipes. As a result, the aircraft veered off course for about 100 kilometers and into restricted air space of the Japan Air Self Defense Force, as well as going into a dutch roll at one point, but the aircraft managed to make an emergency landing at Osaka Itami Airport at 8:40 p.m.

As a result of the explosion and the aircraft's violent turbulence, a total of 109 passengers and crew suffered injuries, with 14 of them suffering severe injuries.

== Investigation ==
Initially, it was believed that, like Japan Air Lines Flight 123 a year before, some sort of a mechanical problem was to blame for the incident. While the aircraft was delivered less than three weeks before the incident, the pressurization devices were having issues in the week leading up to the incident, with reports being made that warning lights were turning on.

However, it was quickly revealed after the aircraft was examined by the Osaka Prefectural Police that the explosion was caused by an external explosive source rather than the aircraft itself. Ultimately, a 43-year-old member of the Yamaguchi-gumi admitted to smuggling the hand grenade into the aircraft. The gangster stated that he "accidentally pulled the safety pin off in the toilet that was at the rear left area of the toilet" and that "he tried to put the pin back in, but it didn't work, so he left it behind in the toilet and let it blow up".

== Aftermath ==
The gangster who brought in the hand grenade was not arrested until after he was discharged from the hospital, having suffered severe burns all over his body as oil from a broken hydraulic pipe poured over him during the incident.

The aircraft involved, HS-TAE, was delivered less than three weeks before the incident on October 9. It was repaired and returned to service with Thai Airways. It continued flying for another 21 years before being withdrawn from use in March 2008. It was then ferried to Victorville Airport, where it was scrapped three years later.
