= F-WUAB =

Preserved prototype of the Airbus A300

F-WUAB/F-OCAZ
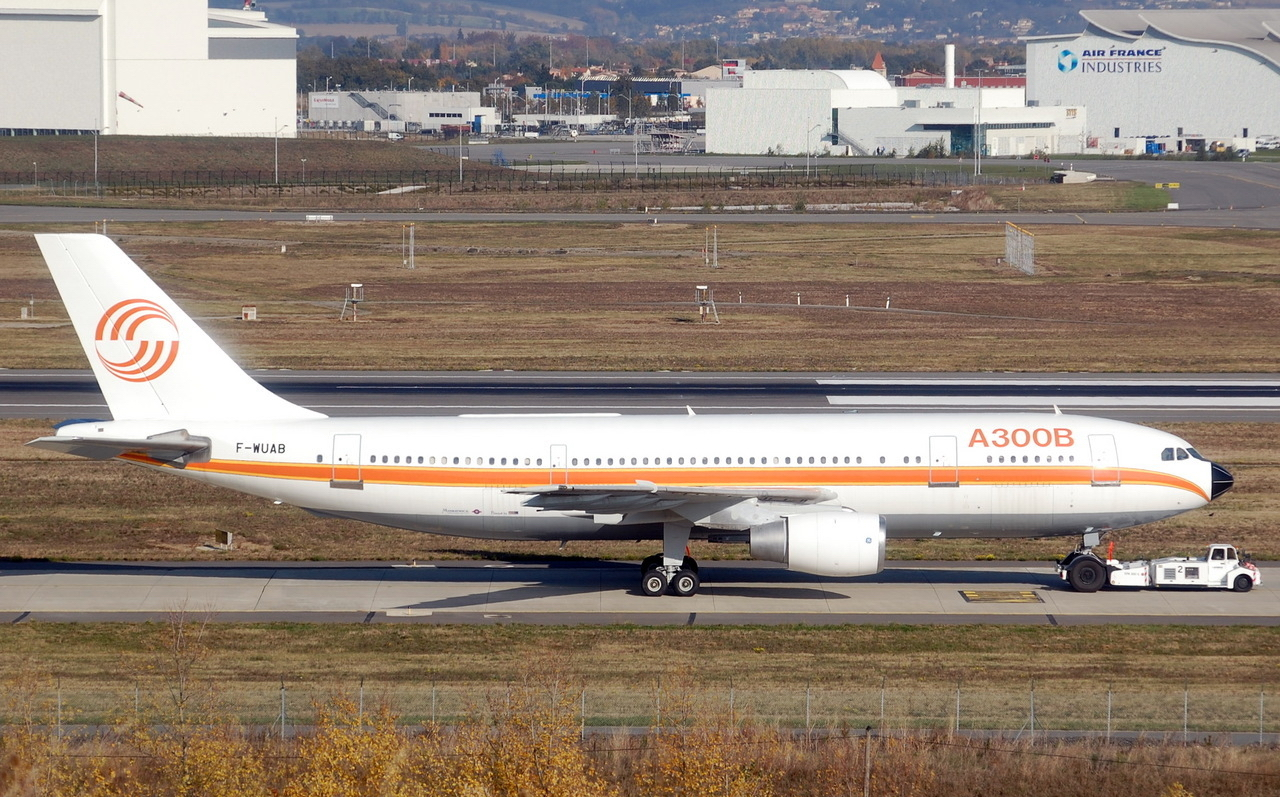

General information
- Type: Airbus A300B1
- Manufacturer: Airbus
- Owners: Airbus Industries
- Registration: F-WUAB (1972-1973); F-OCAZ (1973-1974)
- Serial: 001

History
- Manufactured: 1972
- First flight: October 28th, 1972
- In service: October 28th, 1972-August 27th, 1974
- Last flight: August 27th, 1974
- Preserved at: Partially preserved as a display exhibit at the Deutsches Museum, Munich, Germany
- Fate: Disassembled, on static display

F-WUAB (later known as F-OCAZ) is an Airbus A300B1 that was built by Airbus as the first prototype of the Airbus A300.

== History ==
=== Construction and first flight ===
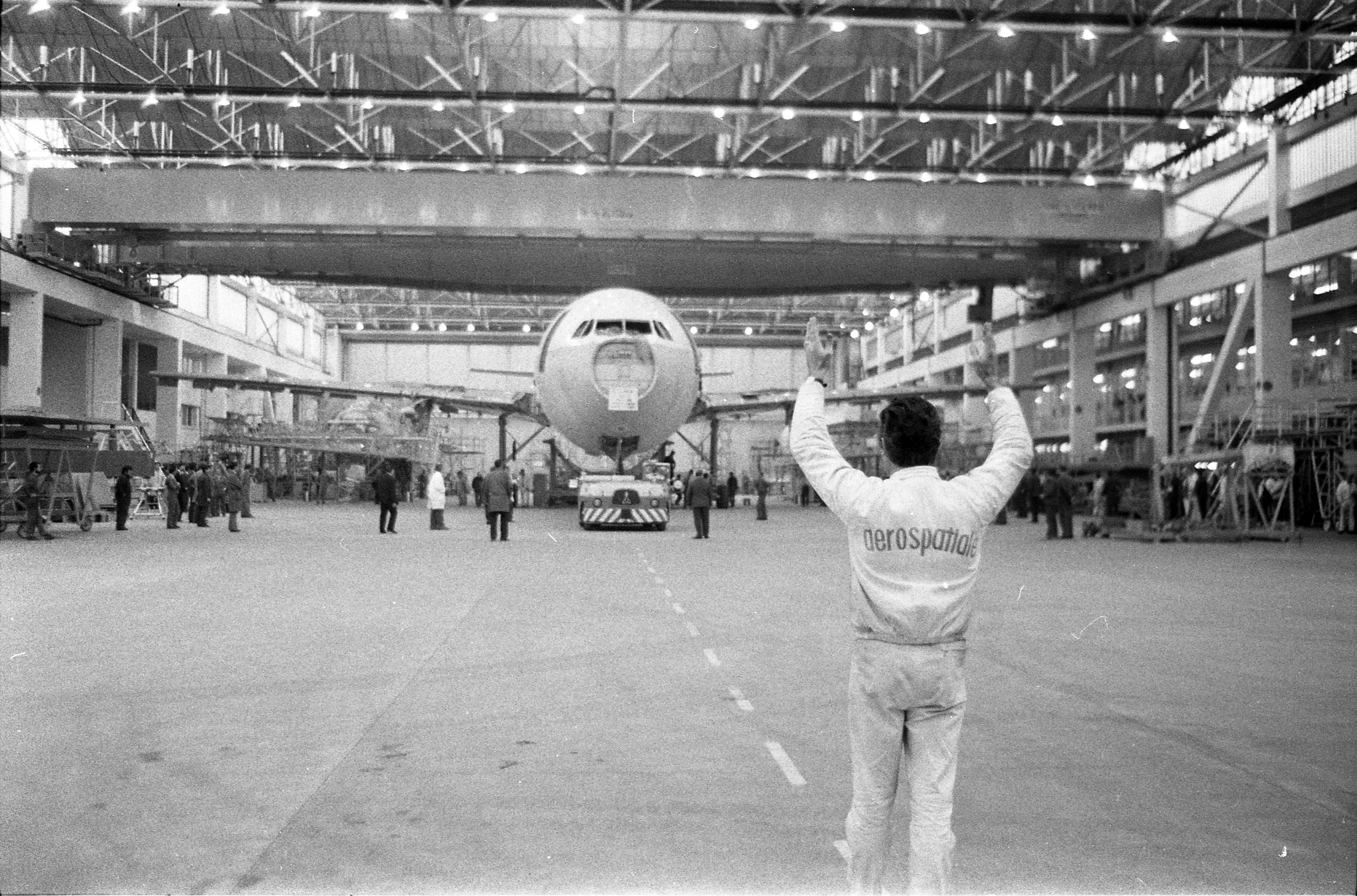
F-WUAB when being constructed in 1972.

The aircraft was assembled at Airbus's Aérospatiale facility based in Toulouse, Occitania, France as the first Airbus A300 aircraft ever built, the prototype aircraft took its first flight on October 28, 1972.

The aircraft had recorded a maximum take-off weight of 132 tonnes (291,000 pounds) and was powered by two General Electric CF6-50A engines.

The Airbus A300B1 type had set several records, including being the first wide-body airliner powered by twin engines, the first commercial aircraft constructed of composite materials, and the first to use center-of-gravity control. It was also the first Extended Operations (ETOPS) compliant aircraft in 1977. The F-WUAB could accommodate 300 passengers in flight.

The aircraft remained as a testbed with its registration F-WUAB until September 1973 when Airbus Industries had reregistered the aircraft as F-OCAZ.

=== Preservation ===
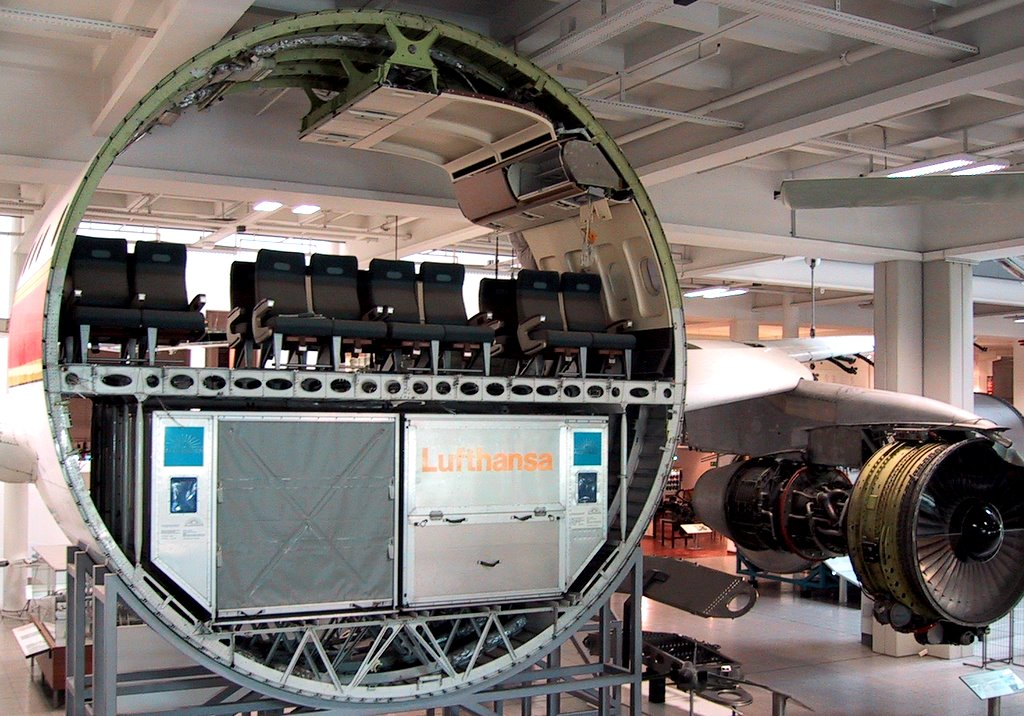
Cross-section of A300 F-OCAZ preserved at the Deutsches Museum

The aircraft was retired on August 27, 1974, after only two years of service as a testbed by Airbus Industries and the aircraft was partially scrapped, but some parts were salvaged and placed on display at the Deutsches Museum based in Munich, Bavaria, Germany. The parts that were salvaged from the breaker's yard included a fuselage section, the right-hand wing, and an engine.
