= Fly Air =

Turkish private airline

IATA	ICAO	Call sign
F2	FLM	FLY AİR
- Founded: 2002
- Ceased operations: 2007
- Hubs: Atatürk International Airport
- Parent company: Fly Havayolu Taşımacılık A.Ş.
- Headquarters: Istanbul, Turkey
- Website: http://www.flyair.com.tr

Fly Air (Turkish: Fly Havayolu Taşımacılık A.Ş.) was a private airline based in Istanbul, Turkey. Originally a charter airline, it also operated scheduled services.

The airline ceased operations in January 2007.

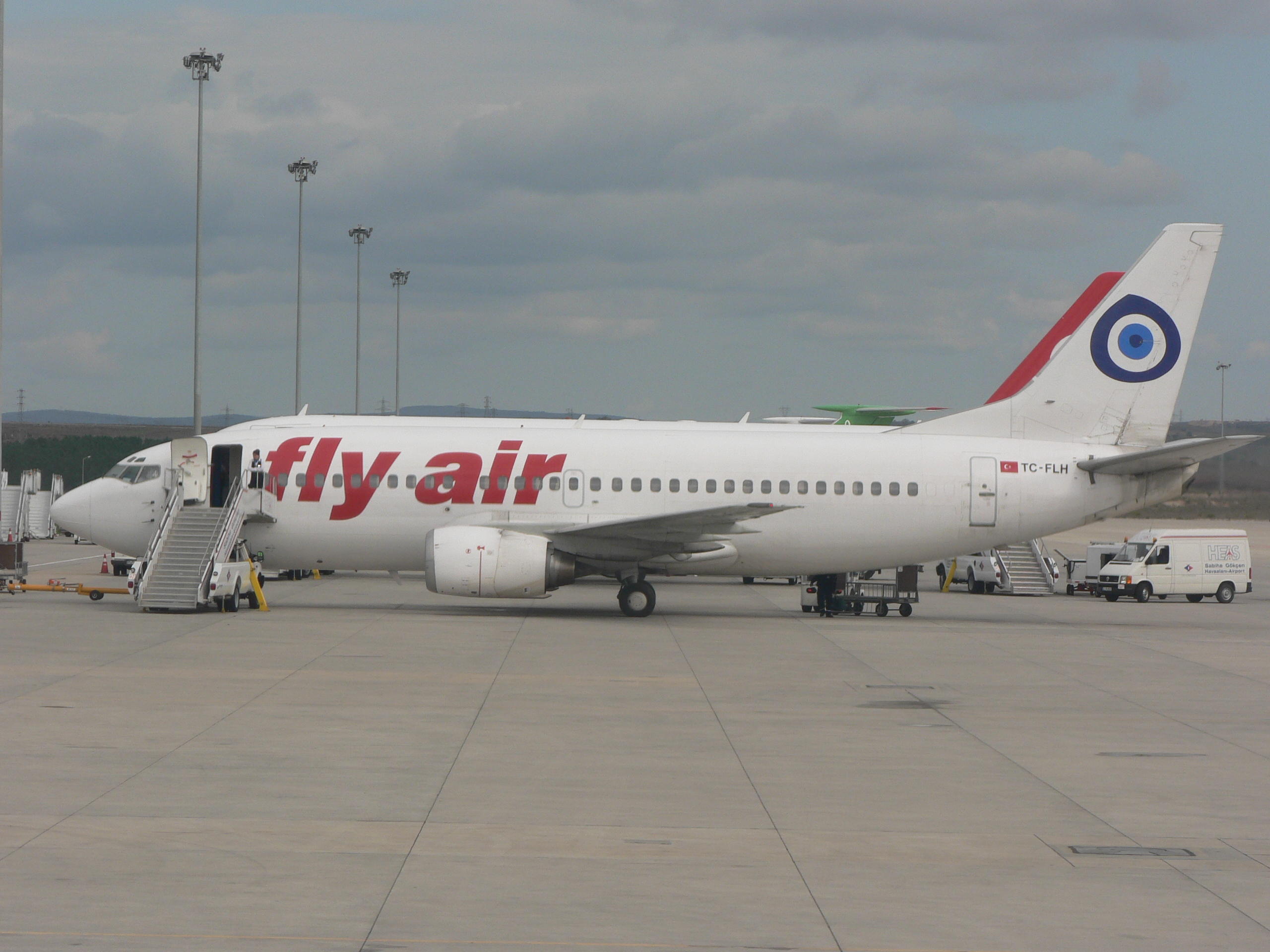
Aircraft with nazar at Sabiha Gökçen International Airport

== History ==
Fly Air was established in 2002 out of the defunct carrier Air Anatolia and operated holiday charter flights. In October 2003, the airline started offering scheduled services. Fly Air was the first charter airline in Turkey with domestic flights. The first domestic flight gained a lot of media coverage as the monopoly of Turkish Airlines was broken. Fly Air ceased operations after financial problems in 2007.

== Destinations ==
Fly Air operated the following services until it ceased operations:

- Domestic scheduled destinations: Ankara, Antalya, Istanbul, İzmir, Northern Cyprus, Bodrum, Trabzon, Urfa and Mardin
- International scheduled destinations: Europe (Netherlands, Belgium, Germany, France, Switzerland, Spain, Italy, Poland), Tel Aviv, Yerevan, Khartoum, Tunis and Egypt.
