= CAE Oxford Aviation Academy Douala =

Flight school in Cameroon

CAE Douala
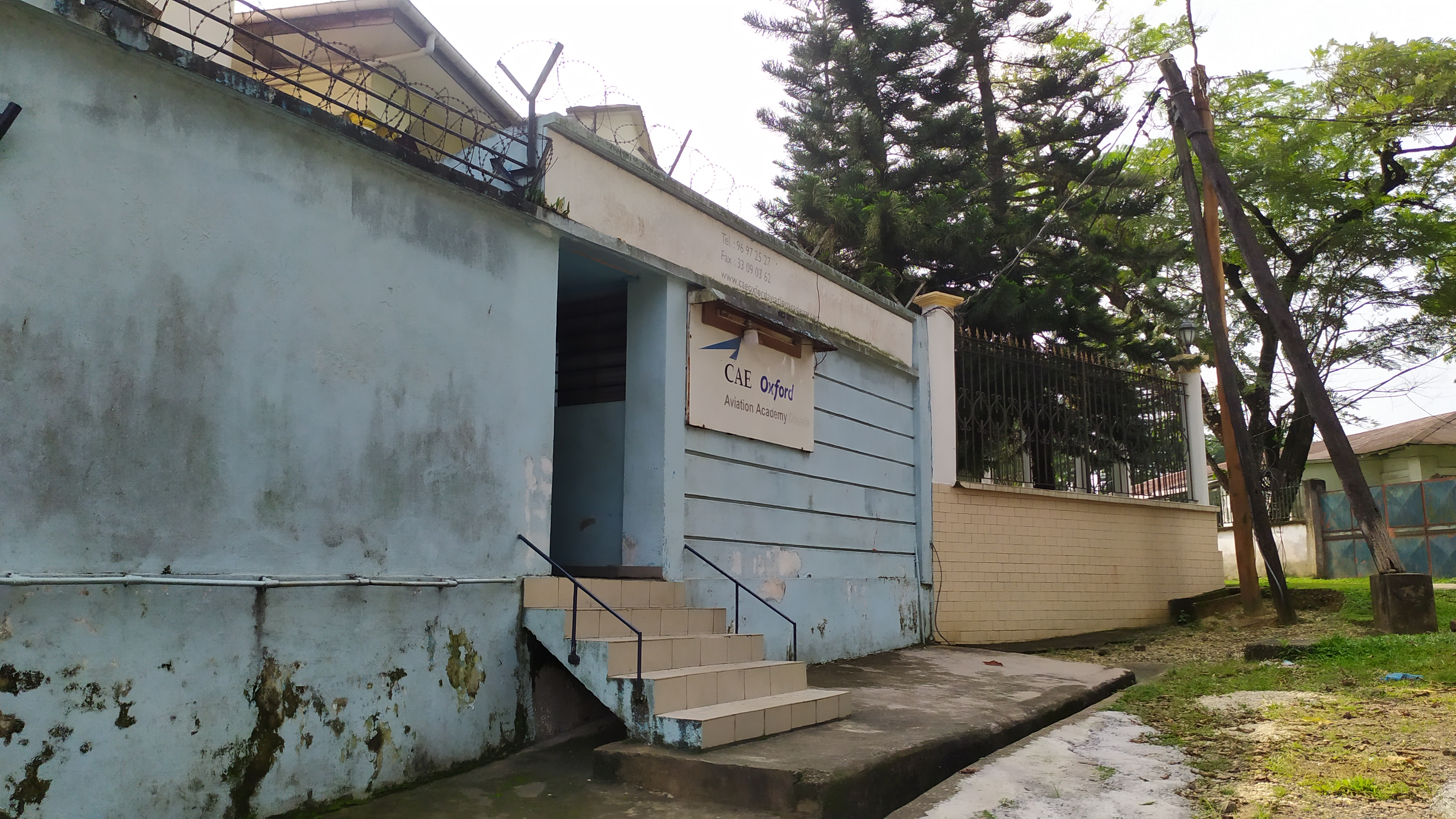
- Other names: CAE SFA-A
- Type: Aviation school
- Established: 2008
- Affiliations: CAE, IAAPS
- Founders: Joseph Barla, Jean-Yves Kotto, Sabena Flight Academy
- Location: Douala, Cameroon; 4°2′50.95″N 9°42′22.95″E
- Campus: Douala
- Website: www.cae.com/becomeapilot

CAE Douala (formerly Sabena Flight Academy Africa) (CAE SFA-A) is an aviation school owned by Canadian group CAE (part of its CAE Global Academy), located at Douala, Cameroon. It was the first civil aviation university in the country.

Former subsidiary of Sabena Flight Academy, the school trains airline pilots, flight attendants (preparation of the Certificat de formation à la sécurité) and flight dispatchers.

== History ==
The school was created in 2008 by Joseph Barla, and Jean-Yves Kotto, as subsidiary of Sabena Flight Academy, a Belgian school created in 1953. A few months later, following the absorption of Sabena Flight Academy by CAE, SFA-A become part of CAE Global Academy, renamed CAE Global Academy Douala.

== Equipments ==
On its Douala campus, the school has three flight simulators : one FNPT2 calibrated like a Boeing 737-800, a second FNPT2 showing the Diamond DA42 and a FNPT1 dedicated to instrument flight rules training.
