= Sabena Flight Academy =

Coordinates: 50°54′9.75″N 4°30′16.44″E

CAE Oxford Aviation Academy Brussels - Sabena Flight Academy
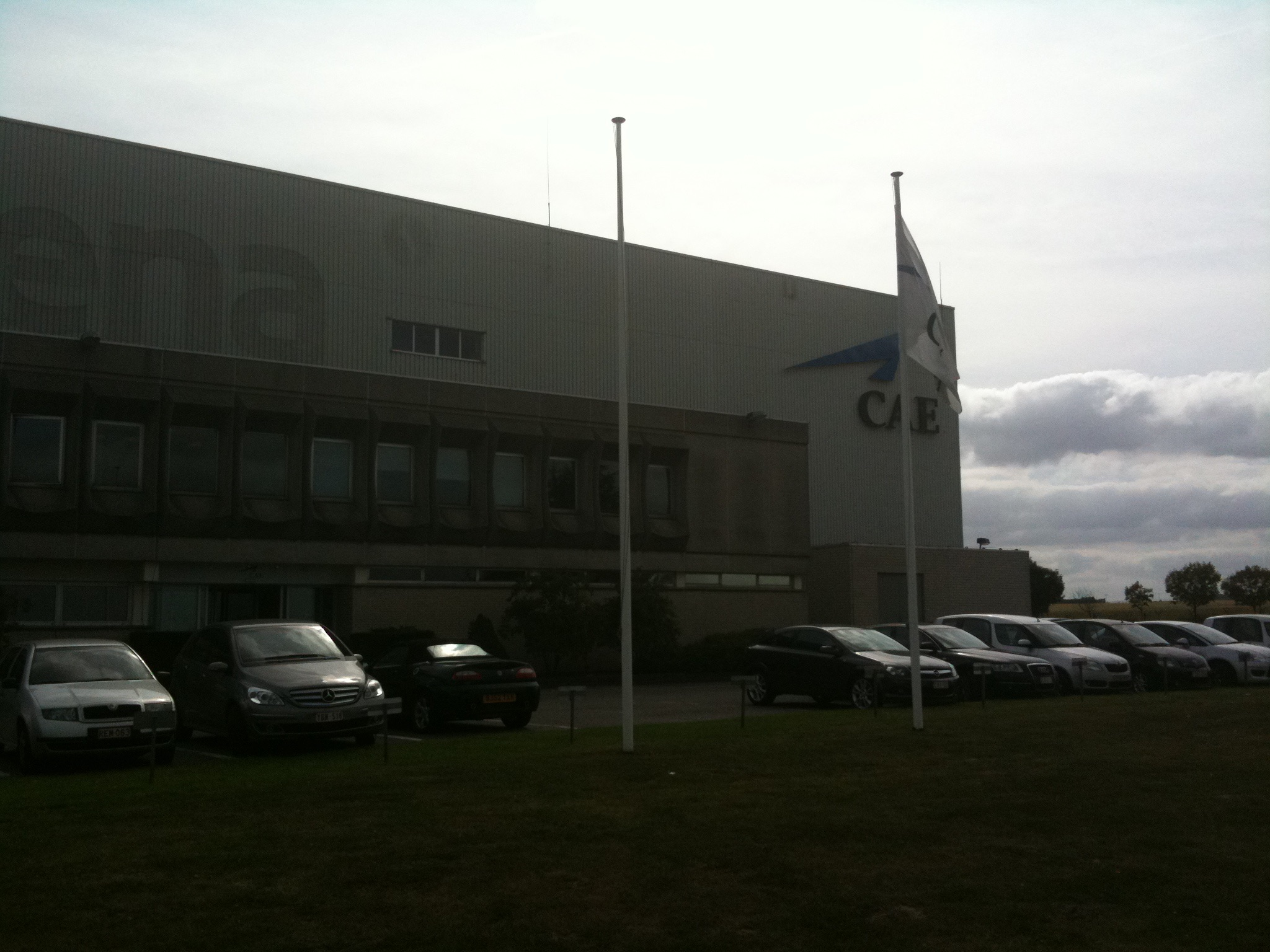
- Motto: One step ahead
- Motto in English: One step ahead
- Type: Airline pilot school
- Established: 1953
- Affiliations: CAE, IAAPS
- Director-General: Francis Clavette
- Location: Steenokkerzeel, Mesa, Évora, Belgium, United States, Portugal
- Campus: Brussels Airport, Falcon Field Airport, Évora Airport
- Colours: Blue and Grey
- Nickname: CAE SFA

CAE Oxford Aviation Academy Brussels - Sabena Flight Academy is an aviation training organisation created in 1953, and located in Steenokkerzeel (Belgium). The school is now part of CAE Global Academy. The training is performed in Brussels, in Mesa at CAE Oxford Aviation Academy Phoenix (formerly Sabena Airline Training Center). Sabena Flight Academy is one of the oldest airline transport pilot schools in Europe.

The "Airline Transport Pilot Integrated" ("ATP Integrated") course is a full-time, integrated Joint Aviation Authorities/European Aviation Safety Agency (JAA/EASA) course leading to the award of a 'frozen' (becoming unfrozen when the candidate has completed 1500 hours in a multi-pilot environment) Airline Transport Pilot License (ATPL).

== History ==
=== The Belgian national aviation school ===
The origins of the creation of a school providing training for future airline pilots were in 1953, when the Belgian government, which owned the aircraft, contracted the operation thereof to Sabena under the name École d’aviation civile (EAC). The theoretical and flight training parts were conducted at the airfield of Grimbergen in a building which no longer exists. Basic training was done using de Havilland DH.82 Tiger Moths, replaced in 1968 by Siai Marchetti SF260s, while advanced training was entrusted to the Saab Safir 91B, replaced in 1958 by the Cessna 310B and in 1981 by the Embraer Xingu.

=== The Sabena airline flight school ===
In 1991, the government gifted the École d’aviation civile to Sabena. It was first renamed Belgian Aviation School and then Sabena Air Training Center, and the school moved into a new building at Brussels National Airport. It was decided to carry out practical flight training in Phoenix in the USA because the weather in Arizona allows flights 365 days per year in a high and complex air traffic environment. Despite the bankruptcy of Sabena in 2001, the flying school continued in operation. In 2004, the school was sold to two former managers of Sabena and became the Sabena Flight Academy.

=== The acquisition by CAE ===
It was finally absorbed in 2008 by the Canadian group CAE. The acquisition of SFA by CAE was conducted as part of a larger program to complete a global training network: the CAE Global Academy.

== Subsidiary ==
The school has two subsidiaries:

- Sabena Flight Academy Africa located at Douala in Cameroun.
- Sabena Airline Training Center (SATC) located at Mesa in Arizona.

== ATP Integrated course structure ==
=== Assessment ===
To gain a place on the course it's necessary to complete an assessment at Sabena Flight Academy. The assessment is designed to test candidates:

- Physics knowledge
- English
- Personality
- Motivation
- Psychological profile

If successful in completing the assessment to the necessary standard then applicants are welcomed to join the APP course, with new courses starting approximately 3 times a year.

=== Ground School ===
The first nine months of the course are all completed in Brussels and it is during this time that students work to complete the 14 JAA/EASA ATPL theoretical exams and twenty hours of simulator (FNPT2). Completion of these exams and the pass the simulator check is a pre-requisite to travelling to Mesa to complete the practical flying and taking of the CPL Skills Test.

The 14 ATPL exams are as follows:

- Air Law
- Airframes/Systems/Powerplant
- Instrumentation
- Mass & Balance
- Aircraft Performance
- Flight Planning
- Human Performance
- Meteorology
- General Navigation
- Radio Navigation
- Operational Procedures
- Principles of Flight
- VFR Communications
- IFR Communications

At the end of the nine months students will have completed 750 hours of ground school.

=== Initial Flight Training ===
The next six months of the course are spent in Mesa, USA. The first 140 hours of flying are completed on the Diamond DA20 or Piper Archer and Diamond DA40, a single piston engine aircraft. 28 hours of flying are then completed in the Diamond DA42 or Piper Seminole, a multi engine aircraft which is used for the CPL Skills Test. When successful then students return from Mesa with a Multi Engine IR Commercial Pilot Licence.

=== Advanced Flight Training ===
The Advanced Flight Training takes place back in Antwerp and students will complete 8 hours flight time in the Diamond DA42 or Piper Seneca V. This flying is designed to teach students to use aircraft instruments in Europe's air traffic environment.

=== Airline Career Preparation Program ===
The final phase of training takes place over three weeks using a six axis full motion Boeing 737-CL, Boeing 737-NG or Airbus A320 simulator at Brussels airport. 28 hours are dedicated to the multi-crew cooperation course (MCC) which teaches students how to work effectively in a multi-crew environment, with a jet aircraft and prepare airline selection tests.

In summary the integrated course consists of 243 hours of flight training and 750 hours of ATPL theoretical knowledge training and lasts approximately 18 months – culminating in the issue of a JAA CPL with Instrument Rating and Multi-Crew Cooperation credit. Following this course, a pilot is now qualified to gain employment in any airline within the JAA licensing region as a First Officer.

== Fleet ==
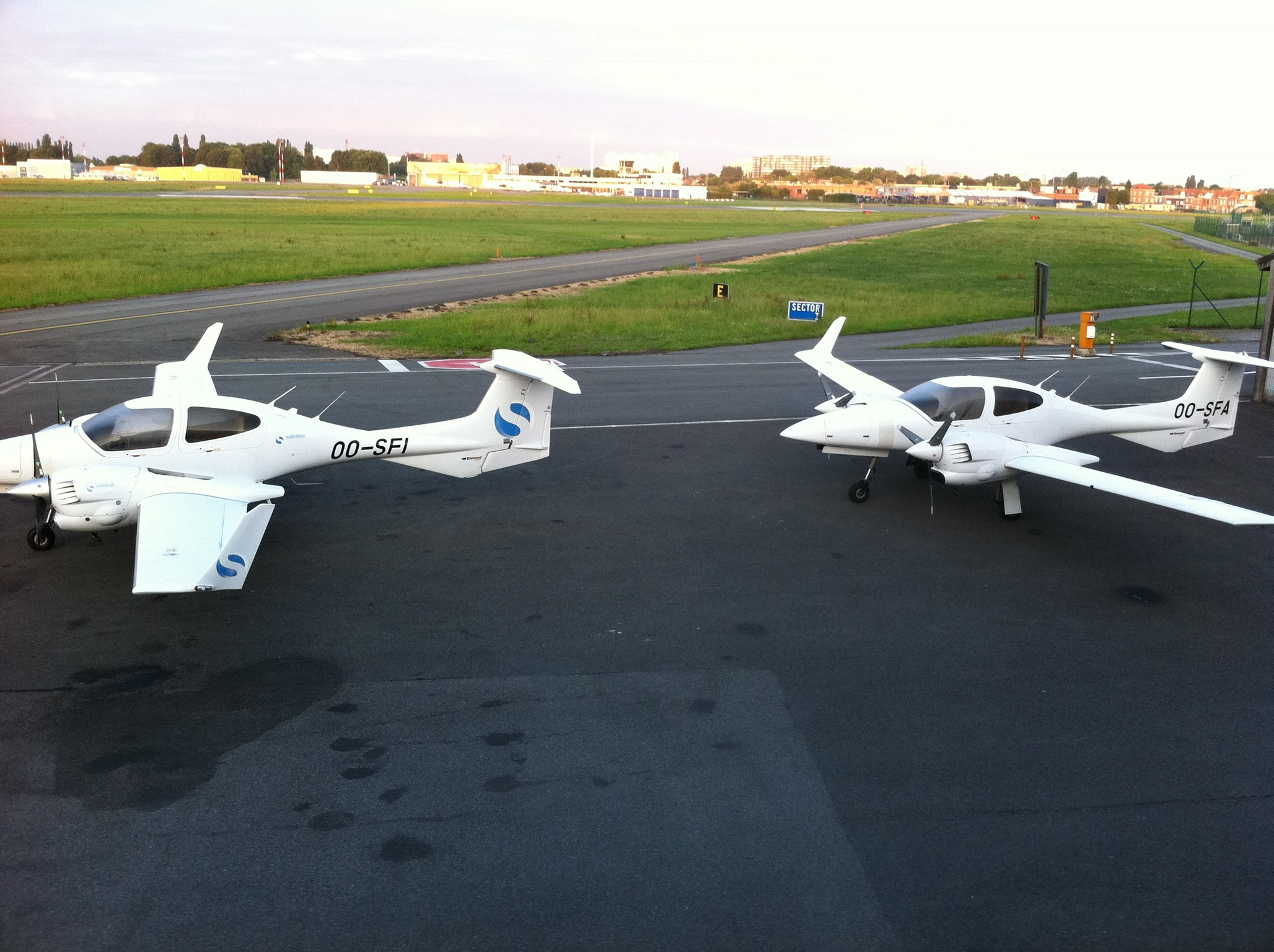
Diamond DA42 Sabena Flight Academy

Aircraft	Fleet	Location
Diamond DA20	2	Phoenix
Diamond DA40	21	Phoenix
Diamond DA42	4	Phoenix
Piper Archer	14	Phoenix
Diamond DA42	2	Antwerp

Simulator	Location
Airbus A320	Brussels
Airbus A330/A340	Brussels
Lockheed C-130 Hercules	Brussels
Boeing 737-300/400/500	Brussels
Boeing 737 Next Generation	Brussels
Boeing 757/767	Brussels

== Bibliography ==
- Olivier Wilmart, De Sabena à Air France, Éditions Racine, 2002, 285 p. (ISBN 2-87386-288-2)
- Olivier Wilmart, La nuque bleue, Éditions Racine, 2007, 196 p. (ISBN 978-2-87386-502-3)
- Willy Buysse, Marguerite Coppens, Etienne Reunis, Frans Van Humbeek, Michel Wautelet, Sabena, le progrès venait du ciel, Bruxelles, Borgerhoff & Lamberigts, 2011, 224 p. (ISBN 9789089312525)
