= Bansard International =

French logistics company

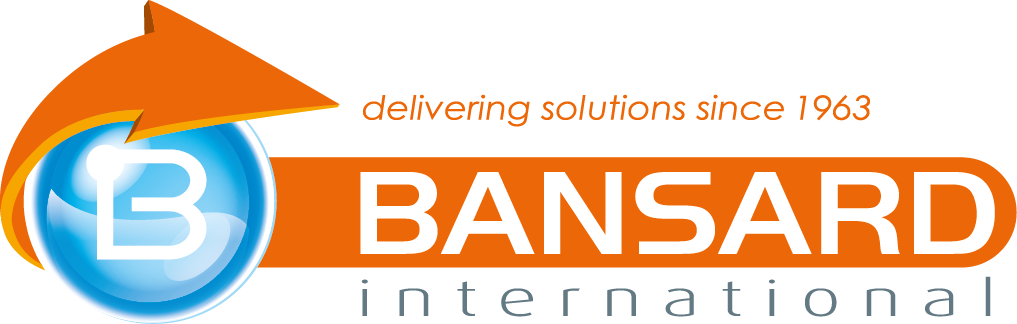

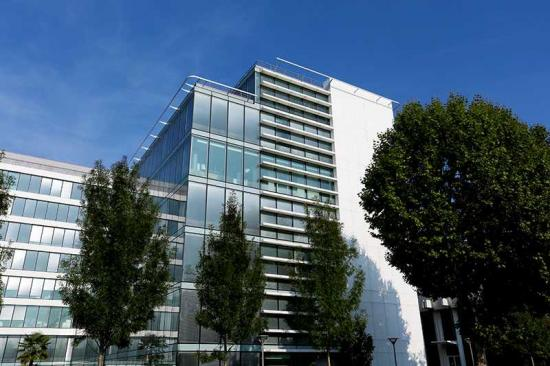
- Bansard Headquarters in Rungis, France
- Type: Private company
- Industry: Transportation
- Founded: 1963; 63 years ago
- Founder: Jean-Pierre Bansard
- Headquarters: 40 rue d'Arcueil, Rungis, France
- Area served: Worldwide
- Key people: Simon Pinto (President)
- Services: Logistics Freight forwarding
- Number of employees: 600
- Website: www.bansard.com/en

Bansard International was a French company of third party logistics and freight forwarding. The company serviced Europe, North Africa, the Middle East, Asia and North America, offering multimodal transportation services via air, sea, road and railway. In 2021, Bansard was acquired by SEKO Logistics.

== History ==
Founded by Jean-Pierre Bansard in 1963 as the Bansard International Transportation Group, the company began by offering road transportation services within Europe. This later expanded to shipments by air, sea and rail, with the company providing full transport industry–type logistical services.

Bansard's clients are primarily in the business-to-business (B2B) and business-to-consumer (B2C) sectors, with the company's shipping services handling textiles, cosmetics, automotive parts, alcoholic beverages and other goods.

=== Company milestones ===
In 1965, Bansard opened its airfreight department with offices in Orly and later offices located within Charles de Gaulle airport in Paris.

In 1977, the company opened a custom brokerage department along with its first bonded warehouse in Orly, France.

After joining the company in 2000, Simon Pinto became main shareholder and CEO in 2003. The company opened subsidiaries in Belgium and China. Its Shanghai office was made Asia-Pacific regional headquarters.

In 2007, Bansard entered into agreement with Allport UK, a freight forwarding company, opening 39% of Bansard's capital. Bansard opened several offices in France: Poitiers, Limoges and Strasbourg.

In 2013, Bansard expanded in China and opened new subsidiaries in Spain and India. In North Africa, new offices were inaugurated in Tunisia and Morocco. The US Federal Maritime Commission (FMC) solicited comments on its plan to pool resources in shipping known as the P3 Vessel Sharing Agreement, a plan described as "unprecedented in its scale and scope." Bansard, along with many of its shipping industry colleagues, indicated their support for FMC's entry into the P3 Agreement. Bansard also implemented plans to handle cargo which fails to fill an entire shipment container, known in the industry as LCL (Less than Container Load), on select shipments to North African countries from five areas of departure in Europe.

In 2014, Bansard acquired CrossLog, a software company specializing in E-commerce logistics such as warehouse management systems and transport management systems. The company was renamed Crosslog International. Bansard also opened offices in Bangladesh and Thailand.

In 2015, Bansard opened subsidiaries in Vietnam and Israel, and launched offices and warehouses in Nanjing, China.

In 2016, Bansard opened subsidiaries in Cambodia, Singapore and entered into a joint-venture in the United States with Anker International.

In 2019, Bansard acquired a stake in the Australian company Cargo Line International.

In 2021, Bansard International was acquired by SEKO Logistics.

== Locations ==
Bansard manages its logistics and shipping operations from offices located in the following cities:

Bansard office locations
Region	Country	Cities
Europe	Belgium	
Europe	Belgium	Antwerp
Europe	Belgium	Tournai
Europe	Belgium	Zaventem
Europe	France	Roissy-En-France
Europe	France	Bordeaux
Europe	France	Le Havre
Europe	France	Lille
Europe	France	Limoges
Europe	France	Lyon
Europe	France	Marseille
Europe	France	Moissy-Cramayel
Europe	France	Nantes
Europe	France	Rungis (HQ)
Europe	France	Paris
Europe	France	Poitiers
Europe	France	Strasbourg
Europe	Spain	Barcelona
Europe	Spain	Madrid
Asia-Pacific	Bangladesh	Chittagong
Asia-Pacific	Bangladesh	Dhaka
Asia-Pacific	Cambodia	Phnom Penh
Asia-Pacific	China	Guangzhou
Asia-Pacific	China	Hong Kong
Asia-Pacific	China	Nanjing
Asia-Pacific	China	Ningbo
Asia-Pacific	China	Qingdao
Asia-Pacific	China	Shanghai (HQ)
Asia-Pacific	China	Shenzhen
Asia-Pacific	China	Tianjin
Asia-Pacific	China	Xiamen
Asia-Pacific	China	Yiwu
Asia-Pacific	India	Mumbai
Asia-Pacific	India	New Delhi
Asia-Pacific	Singapore	Singapore
Asia-Pacific	Thailand	Bangkok
Asia-Pacific	Vietnam	Hanoi
Asia-Pacific	Vietnam	Ho Chi Minh City
North America	Mexico	Guadalajara-Jalisco
North America	USA	Atlanta
North America	USA	Los Angeles
North America	USA	Miami
North America	USA	New York City
Middle East/ North Africa	Israel	Ashdod
Middle East/ North Africa	Israel	Haifa
Middle East/ North Africa	Morocco	Casablanca
Middle East/ North Africa	Morocco	Tangier
Middle East/ North Africa	Tunisia	Radès

Rungis serves as Bansard's European regional headquarters while Shanghai serves as its Asia-Pacific regional headquarters.
