= CAF Airbase Arizona =

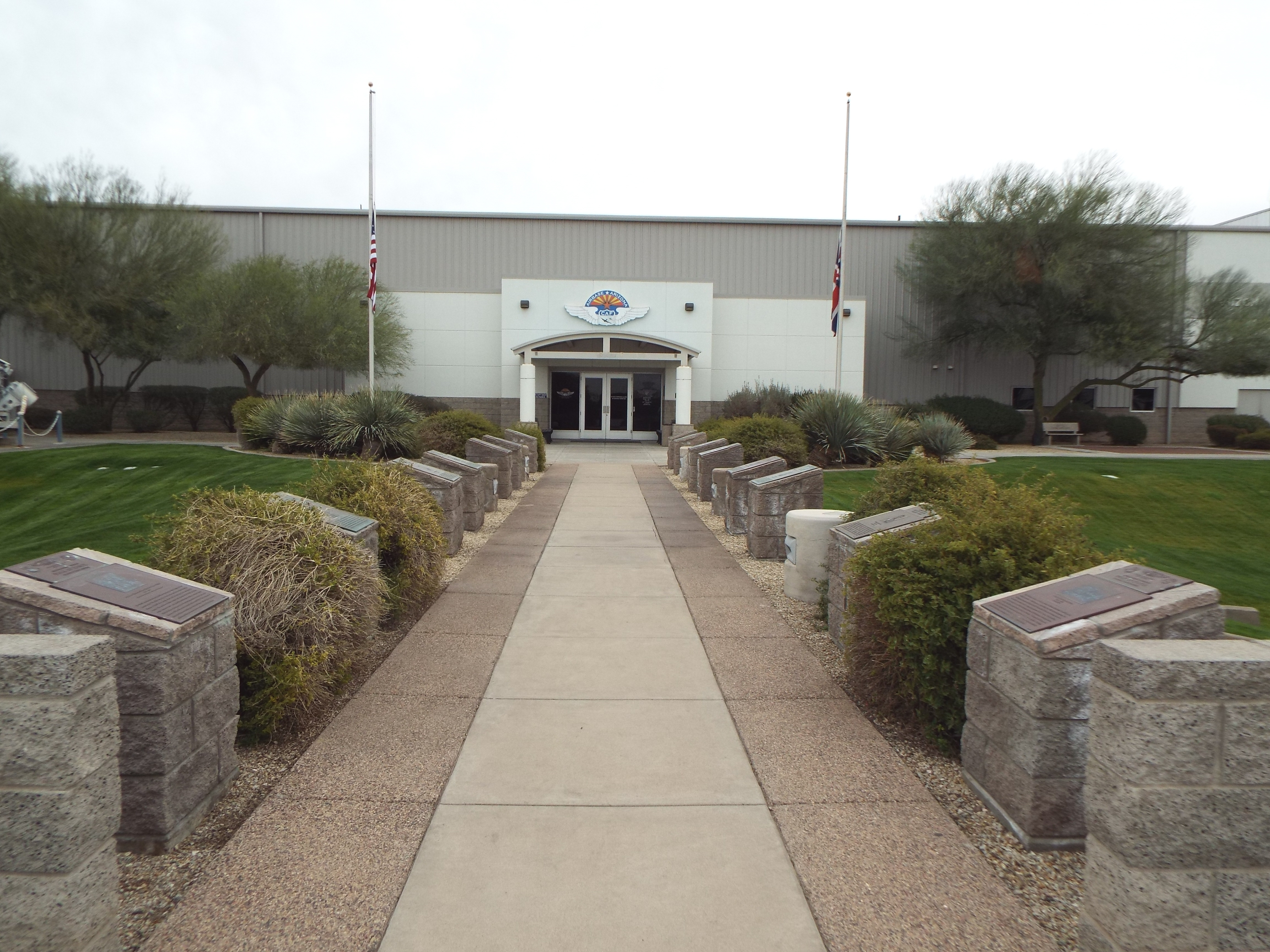
- Entrance and Walk of Honor

- Location within Arizona
- Established: 1978
- Location: 2017 N. Greenfield Rd. Mesa, Arizona
- Coordinates: 33.4525°N 111.7349°W
- Type: Aviation museum
- Website: www.azcaf.org

The CAF Airbase Arizona, a.k.a. Arizona Commemorative Air Force Museum, was established in 1978, in Falcon Field in Mesa, Arizona. It is the 10th unit of the Commemorative Air Force and the home of one of the largest Commemorative Air Force units. On exhibit are World War II artifacts, helicopters and classic American and foreign combat planes.

== History ==
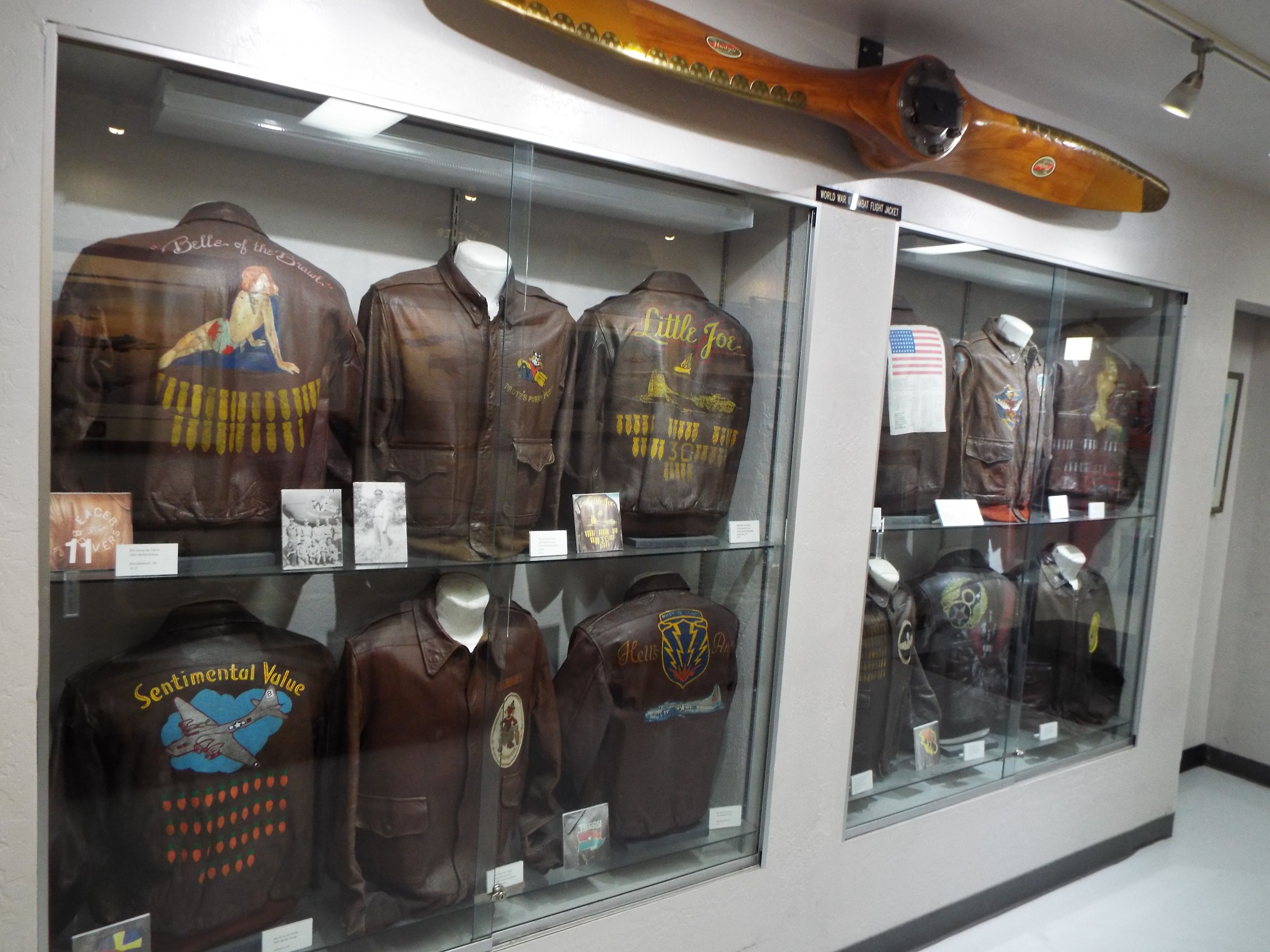
World War II aviators jackets

Airbase Arizona can trace its history to 6 September 1961, when the Commemorative Air Force was founded. The non-profit organization was chartered as a nonprofit Texas corporation in Dallas. Its mission is to restore and preserve World War II-era combat aircraft. The idea of establishing the organization came about when in 1957, Lloyd Nolen and a small group of ex-service pilots from the Rio Grande Valley in Texas invested their money towards the purchase of a P-51 Mustang.

Aircraft enthusiasts in Arizona became interested in establishing a branch of the Commemorative Air Force in their home state. After months of searching, Falcon Field was chosen as the new site for the Arizona Commemorative Air Force Museum. Falcon Field was established before World War II when Hollywood producer Leland Hayward and pilot John H. "Jack" Connelly founded Southwest Airways with funding from Henry Fonda, Fred Astaire, Ginger Rogers, James Stewart and Hoagy Carmichael. In 1977, a small group broke ground at Falcon Field and in 1978, the museum was officially opened to the public. The Arizona Wing became the 10th unit of the Commemorative Air Force.

In front of the museum's entrance is one of four propellers which were once installed on a B-29 Super Fortress. Also on display on the front lawn of the building is a 3-inch Mark 33 deck gun. The deck gun was originally mounted on the USS Guam for aircraft defense. There is a "Walk of Honor" located in front of the museum. The Walk of Honor is a tribute which recognizes the contributions made by Arizonans to the field of military aviation. Inductees are honored for their achievement with the installation of a special bronze plaque at the Museum.

The majority of the aircraft and exhibits are located inside the hangar while some in flying condition, are located outside on the airfield. The hangar also houses the museum's gift shop. Some of the aircraft represent those from 1917, however, most of the aircraft are from World War II. On display in the museum are some post-World War II jet fighters. Also on display are military helicopters. Next door to the museum hangar is the Mechanics Hangar where some of the aircraft are repaired and restored. The museum is the home of one of the largest Commemorative Air Force units in the world. Also, on display are various artifacts related to the history of the warbirds, such as jackets worn by the pilots in World War II.

== Exhibits ==
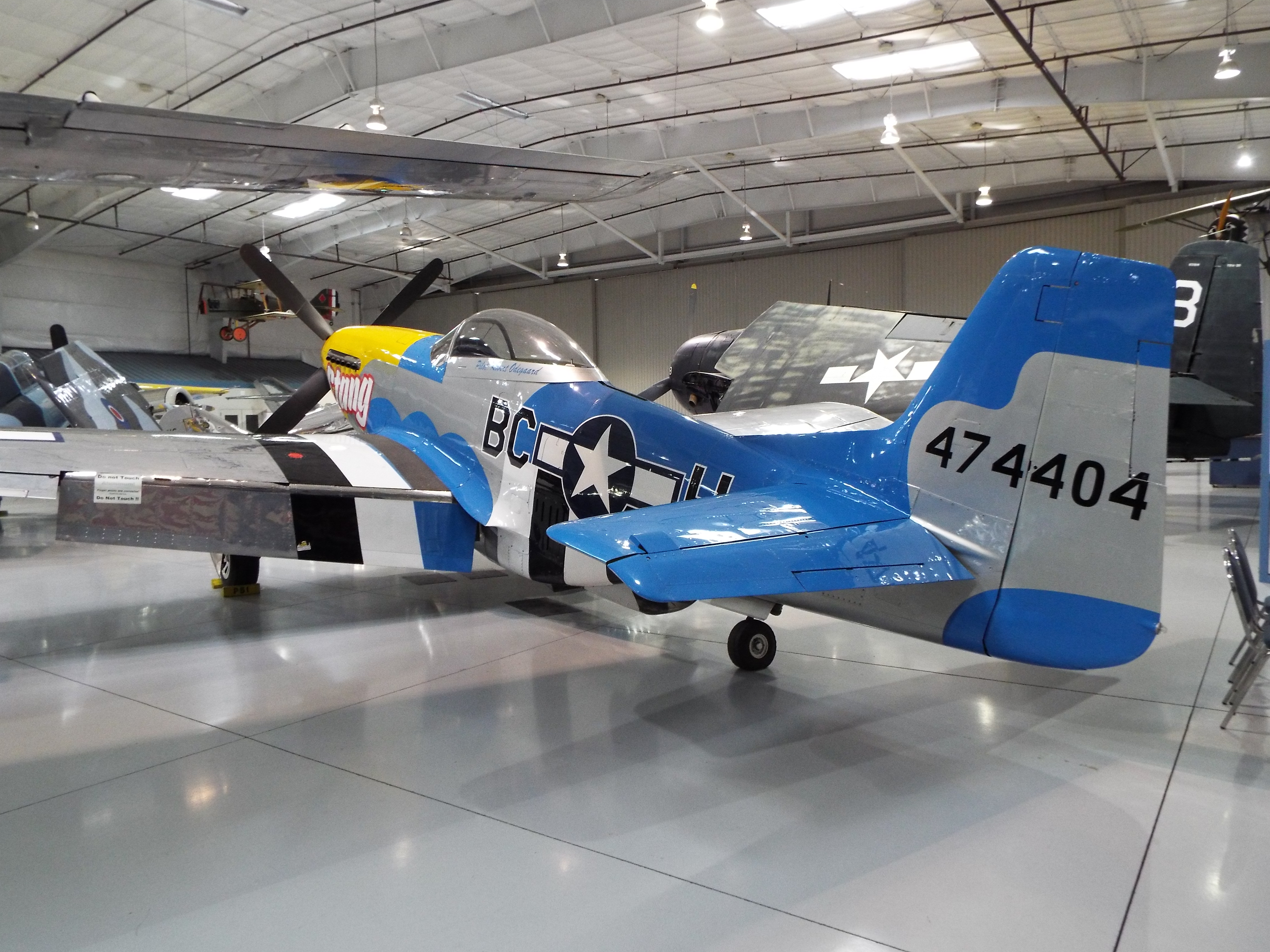
North American P-51D Mustang

- Douglas C-47 Skytrain, which served with the 11th Troop Carrier Squadron. This aircraft flew highly classified missions transporting spies, supplies, and rescuing wounded personnel and refugees. Its missions were lost to history for 70 years. "Old Number 30" is named after one of four mules, serial number 30, flown along with four partisan commandos in the dead of night from Brindisi, Italy, to a top-secret site in the Balkans in 1944. Mule #30, along with 35 other mules hauled twelve 75-mm guns through the mountains to attack Nazi occupiers.
- Beechcraft C-45 Expeditor
- Douglas A-26C Invader named Miss Murphy Serial #: 44-35601.
- Douglas SBD Dauntless
- Lee-Wray Nieuport 17 (N124RX/1). Serial Number 251
- McDonnell Douglas F-4N Phantom II
- Mikoyan-Gurevich MiG-21
- Nieuport 28 C.1, a replica of the French biplane fighter aircraft flown by American Ace Eddie Rickenbacker during World War I.
- Lockheed PV-2 Harpoon (N86492/492/BJ-K)
- North American B-25 Mitchell named Maid in the Shade.
- Grumman TBF Avenger
- North American P-51 Mustang originally named Dazzling Donna. Serial #: 44-74404. Was repainted in June 2006 with the name Stang for the movie "Thunder Over Reno".
- Bell UH-1B Iroquois
- Sikorsky H-19 Chickasaw
- Royal Aircraft Factory S.E.5
- McDonnell Douglas AV-8B Harrier II: Arrived in June 2025 on long-term loan.

== See also ==
- Williams Air Force Base
- Air Training Command
- Arizona World War II Army Airfields
- List of aerospace museums
- List of museums in Arizona
