= Hôtel de Ville, Blagnac =

Town hall in Blagnac, France

Hôtel de Ville
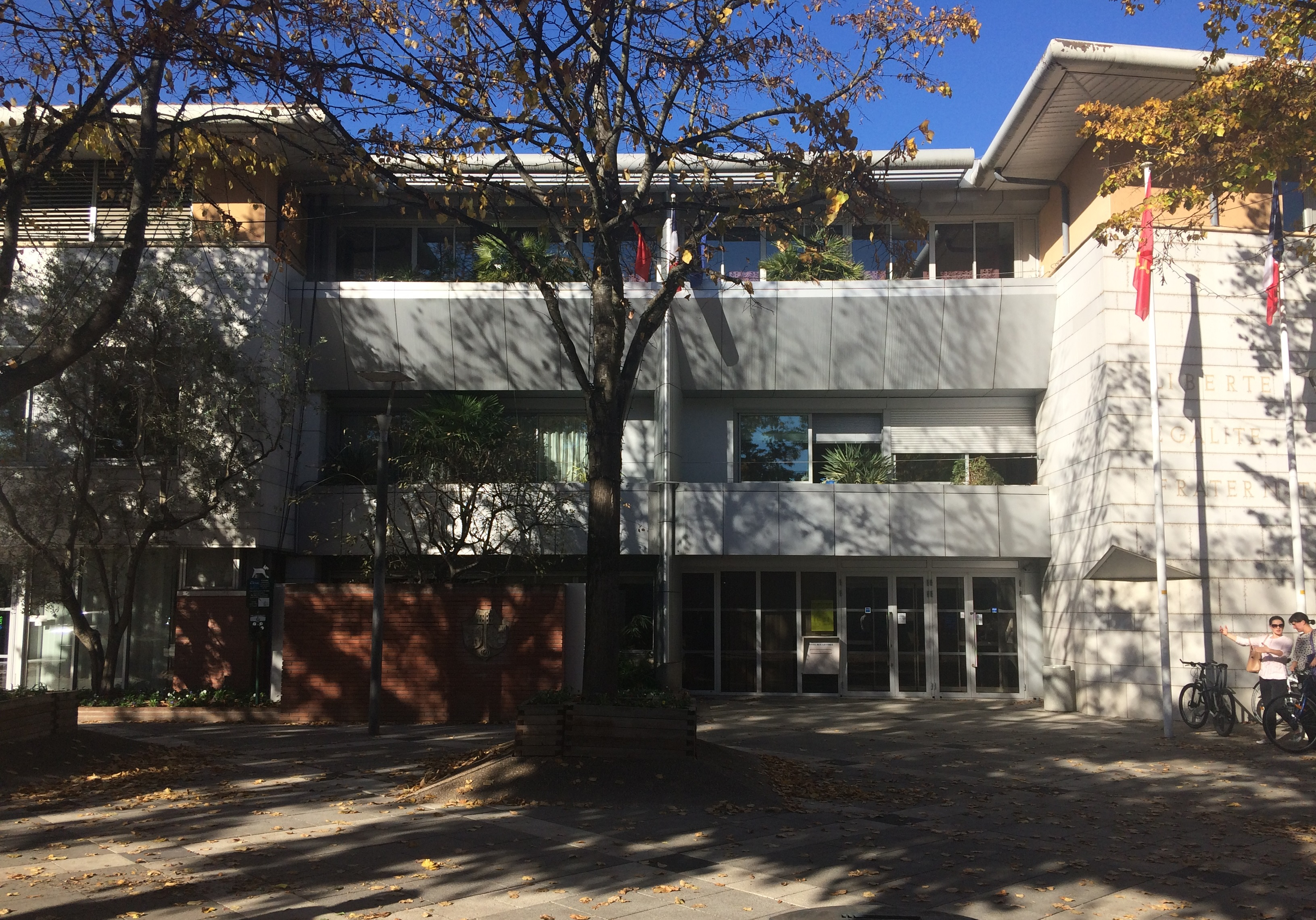
- The main frontage of the Hôtel de Ville in October 2017
- Interactive map of the Hôtel de Ville area

General information
- Type: City hall
- Architectural style: Modern style
- Location: Blagnac, France
- Coordinates: 43.6348°N 1.3973°E
- Completed: 1992

Design and construction
- Architect: G. P. A.

The Hôtel de Ville (French pronunciation: [otɛl də vil], City Hall) is a municipal building in Blagnac, Haute-Garonne, in southwestern France, standing on Place des Arts.

== History ==
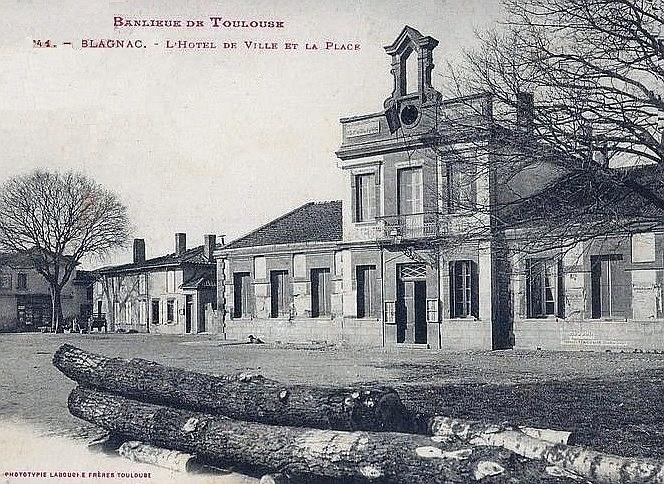
The old town hall

Under the ancien régime the consuls met in a two-storey building, which was also used as a school, in the old part of town, close to the Church of Saint-Pierre. In August 1777, the consuls acquired part of a house at No. 12 Rue du Vieux Blagnac for 1,600 French livre. Following the French Revolution, this building became the Maison Commune: there was a butcher's shop and a village lock-up on the ground floor and a combined courtroom and council chamber on the first floor. Significant repairs were carried out in November 1818 and, after a fire caused damage in October 1836, the building was restored by a local carpenter, Bernard Lartet, in 1837.

In 1865, after the Maison Commune became dilapidated, the council decided to commission a new combined town hall and school. The site they selected was on Rue de l'Oratoire (now Rue Lavigne). The new building was designed by a local architect, Sieur Delor, in the neoclassical style, built in ashlar stone by Sieur Galinié at a cost of FFr 15,374 and was officially accepted by the mayor, Prosper Ferradou, in July 1871. The design involved a symmetrical main frontage of nine bays facing onto the street. The central section of three bays was two storeys high, while the wings of three bays each were single-storey. The central bay featured a square headed doorway on the ground door, a French door with an iron railing on the first floor, and a parapet with an oculus and a tall pediment above. The other bays were fenestrated by casement windows.

In the mid-1960s, following significant population growth, the council led by the mayor, Jean-Louis Puig, decided to commission a modern town hall. The site they selected was on the corner of Rue Prosper Ferradou and what is now Place Jean-Louis Puig. The building was designed by a local architect, René Viguier, in the modern style, built in concrete and glass by a contractor, Constant Bramardi, at a cost of FFr 2 million and completed in 1978. The design involved a two-storey structure in two sections, with the right-hand section slightly projected forward.

In the early 1990s, the council decided to extend the town hall and to add an extra floor to it. The work was undertaken by a contractor, Bisseuil, to a design by the architectural firm, G. P. A., and was completed in summer 1992. As a result of the modifications, the building became a three-storey structure with the end sections projected forward. The central section and the left-hand end section were faced with alternating bands of white panels and casement windows, while the right-hand section was fully faced in white panels. Internally, the principal room was the Salle du Conseil (council chamber).

Between 2018 and 2019, the building was further extended to the rear at a cost of €17 million to allow all council services to be co-located in one building. In January 2021, a mural depicting Marianne by the artist, Méro Raja, was installed on the right-hand end section of the building. It was replaced by a mural also depicting Marianne but by the artist, Korail, in November 2023.

== Sources ==
- Lavigne, Bertrand (1875). Histoire de Blagnac (PDF). L. Capdeville.
- Ricard, Germaine (1 November 1996). Blagnac, questions d'histoire: Revue d'Histoire Locale – Semestriel – No. 12 (PDF). l'Association pour l'Etude et la Présentation de l'Histoire de la Résistance et de Blagnac. ISSN 1169-4408.
