= Airbus Training Centre Europe =

Coordinates: 43.625764°N 1.386671°W

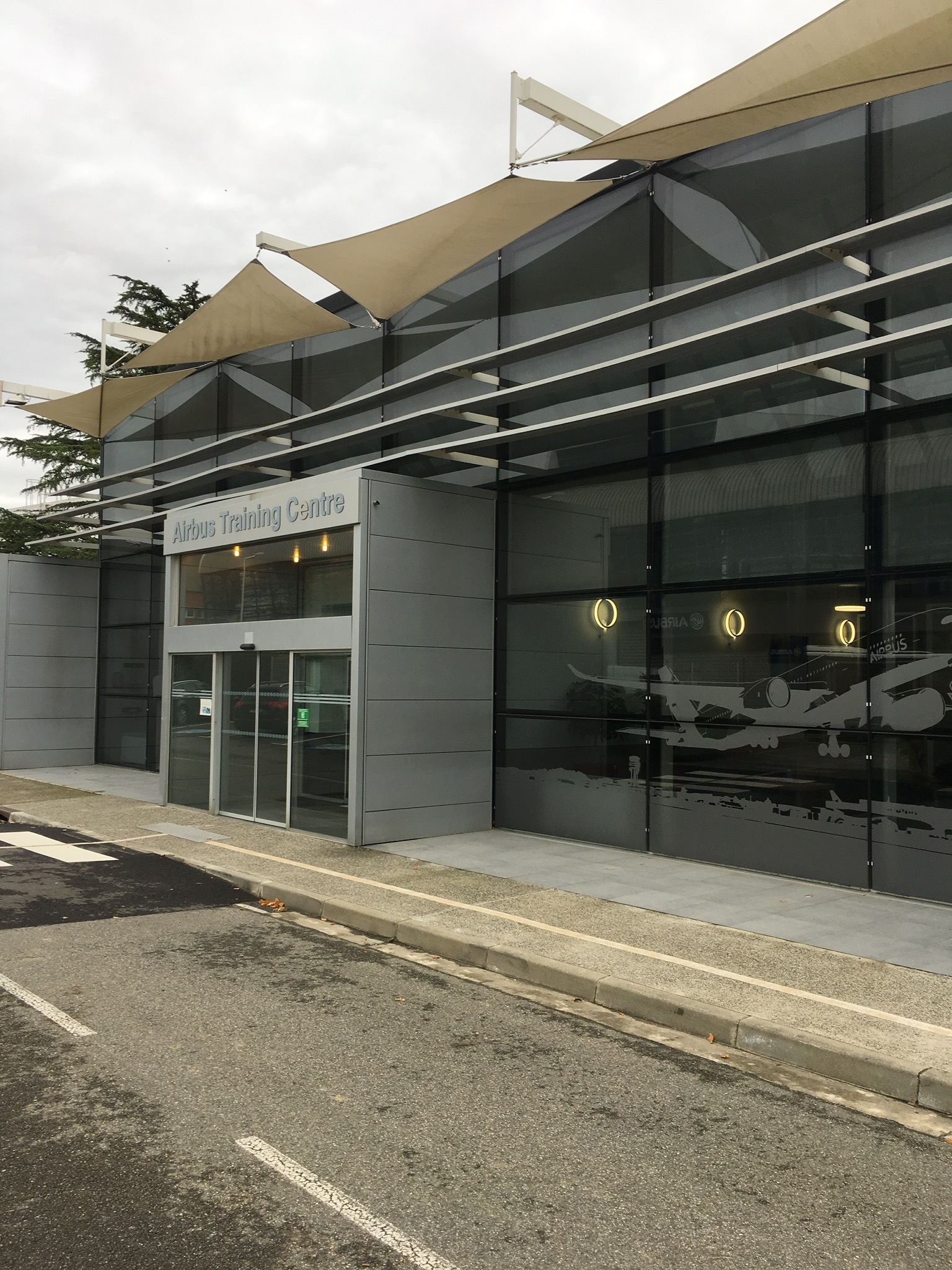
- Type: Type Rating Training Organization
- Affiliations: International Association of Aviation Personnel Schools
- Location: Blagnac, France
- Website: Airbus Training Centre Europe

Airbus Training Centre Europe is one of the eight centres of the European aerospace company Airbus SAS dedicated to airline pilot and engineer training. Located at Blagnac, close to Toulouse, France, the centre is approved to deliver courses on the Airbus A300, A310, A320 family, A330, A340, A350XWB and A380.

The centre is equipped with six full flight simulators.

Airbus SAS also has training centres in Hamburg, Miami, Beijing, Singapore, Bangalore, New Delhi and Mexico. Other Airbus subsidiaries have separate training centres in other locations.
