= CAE Phoenix =

Aviation school in Mesa, Arizona

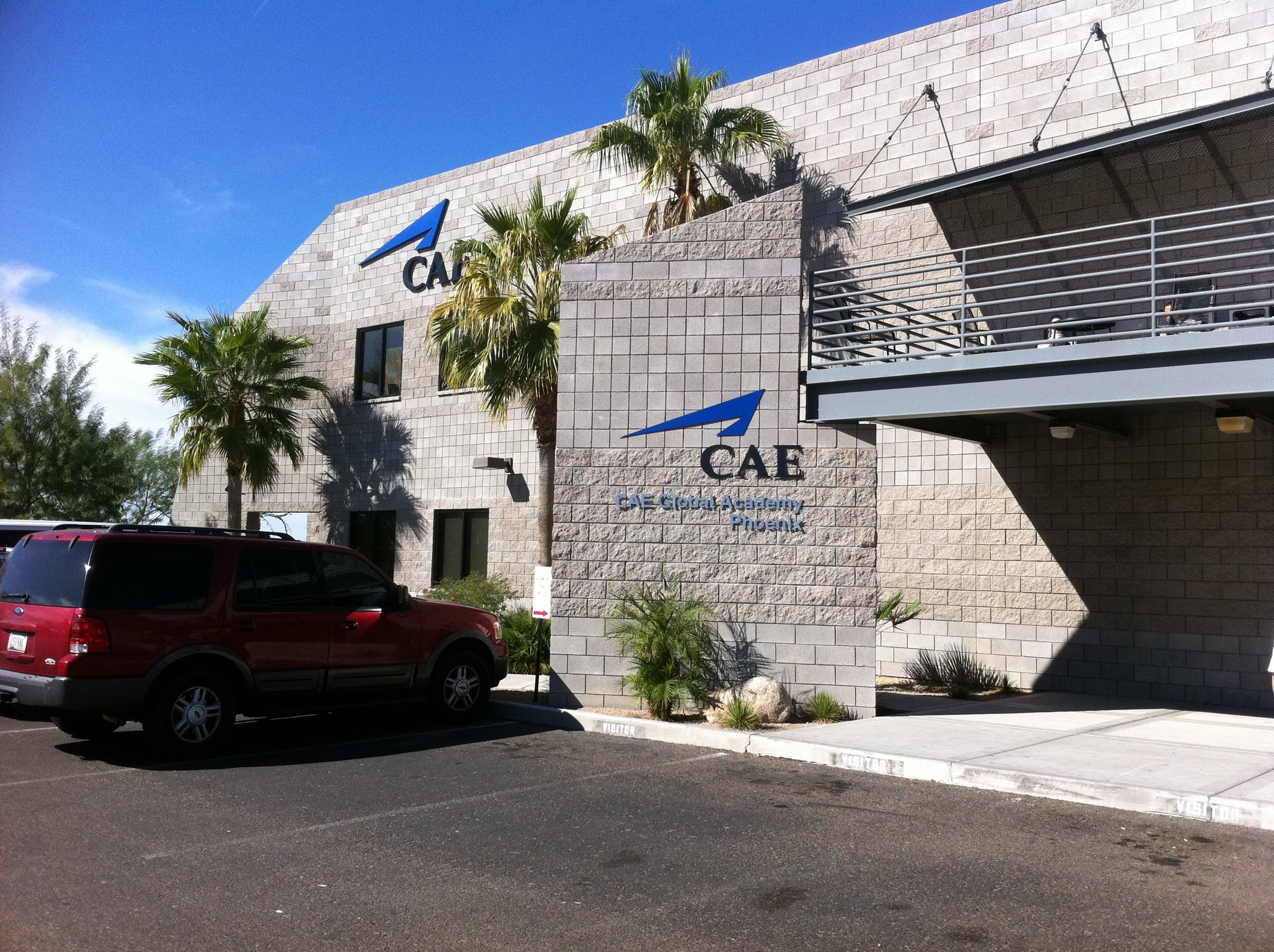
- Motto in English: Your Worldwide Training Partner of Choice
- Type: Aviation school
- Established: 1991
- Affiliations: CAE
- Students: 400 (in 2011)
- Location: Mesa, Arizona, United States; 33°27′36.48″N 111°43′20.07″W
- Campus: Falcon Field Airport
- Colours: Blue and Grey
- Website: www.cae.com/civil-aviation/locations/cae-phoenix-aviation-academy/

CAE Phoenix (formerly CAE Oxford Aviation Academy Phoenix, CAE Global Academy Phoenix and Sabena Airline Training Center) (CAE SATC) is an aviation school owned by CAE and located in Mesa at Falcon Field Airport. A former subsidiary of Sabena Flight Academy, the school has previously trained students including those of Air Algérie, SFA, Nationale Luchtvaartschool (NLS), Turkish Airlines, Shenzhen Airlines, EVA Air, British Airways, Southwest Airlines, Japan Airlines, jetBlue, American Airlines, Emirates, EasyJet, CityJet, IndiGo, Aeromexico and AirAsia.

== History ==
In 1991, the Belgian government contracted the École d'aviation civile (aviation civil school) created in 1953 to Sabena. It was first called Belgian Aviation School and then Sabena Air Training Center as a subsidiary of Sabena Flight Academy. The same year, it was decided to carry out practical training in flight in Phoenix because the weather in Arizona allows for flights throughout the year in a high and complex air traffic environment. In 2008, the Phoenix location of the school was acquired by CAE.

== Fleet ==
CAE Phoenix maintains a fleet of 81 aircraft. All aircraft (except the DA-20) have Garmin G1000s.

CAE Phoenix Fleet
Aircraft	In service
Piper Archer TX	47
Piper Seminole	8
Diamond DA-20	2
Diamond DA-40	5
Cirrus SR20	7
Citation CJ1+	2

== Curriculum ==
In 2011, the school trained 400 pilots per year and offers European (EASA) and American (FAA) courses. The European students are from the CAE Oxford Aviation Academy schools of Oxford, Brussels, and Madrid. The European (EASA) courses train British Airways, Air Algérie, Emirates, EasyJet and self-sponsored cadets. The students of the FAA program are from airline customers like Shenzhen Airlines, Air China Airlines, IndiGo and other private customers. The courses approved by the Federal Aviation Administration enable students to obtain the US licenses of Private pilot, Commercial pilot, instrument rating and flight instructor. Also do they allow FAA cadets to get their 14 CFR High-Altitude and High-performance endorsements. The Multi Crew Pilots License (MPL) Program is currently used by Japan Airlines.

In February 2017, CAE was voted the best Aviation Training Center in Europe.

== Bibliography ==
- Olivier Wilmart, De Sabena à Air France, Racine, 2002, 285 p. (ISBN 2-87386-288-2)
- Willy Buysse, Marguerite Coppens, Etienne Reunis, Frans Van Humbeek, Michel Wautelet, Sabena, le progrès venait du ciel, Bruxelles, Borgerhoff & Lamberigts, 2011, 224 p. (ISBN 9789089312525)

== See also ==
- Sabena
