= Institut aéronautique Jean Mermoz =

Coordinates: 48.7457°N 2.3548°E

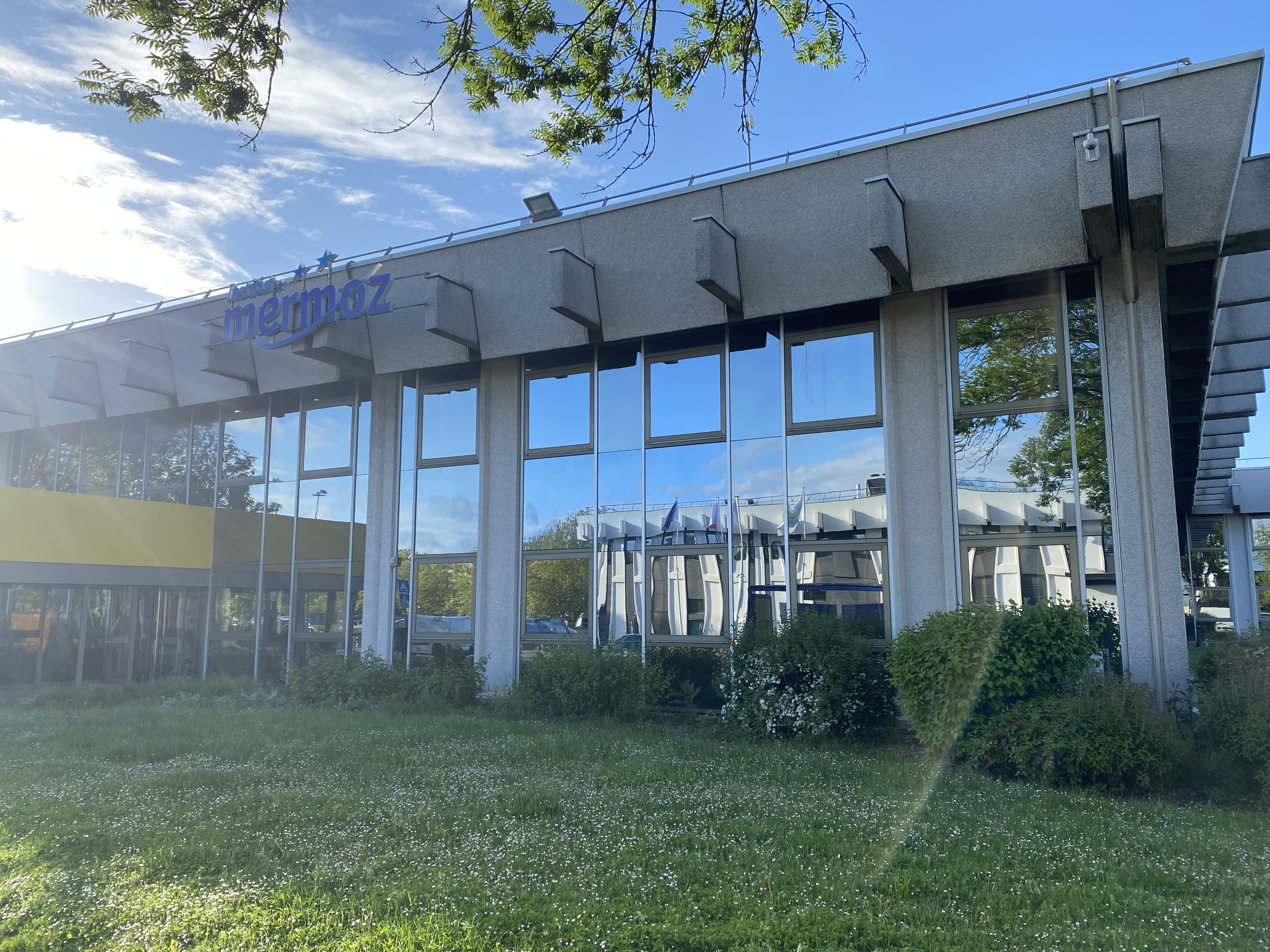
- Type: Private
- Established: 1957
- Affiliations: International Association of Aviation Personnel Schools
- Chancellor: CAPT.Jean-Pierre Chambelin
- Location: Rungis, France
- Campus: Rungis
- Nickname: IAJM

Institut aéronautique Jean Mermoz (IAJM) is a flight training organisation and resourcing services. Professional airline pilots have been trained at IAJM since 1957. It is named after the French aviator Jean Mermoz.

The school also publishes aviation books. The first English books were published at the Paris Air Show 2017, in partnership with Airbus. The school has an agreement with the aerospace college IPSA for a double-degree Master of Science in aviation / ATPL.

The school also trains private pilots, helicopter pilots and cabin crew.
