= Blagnac =

Blagnac Blanhac (Occitan)
- Commune
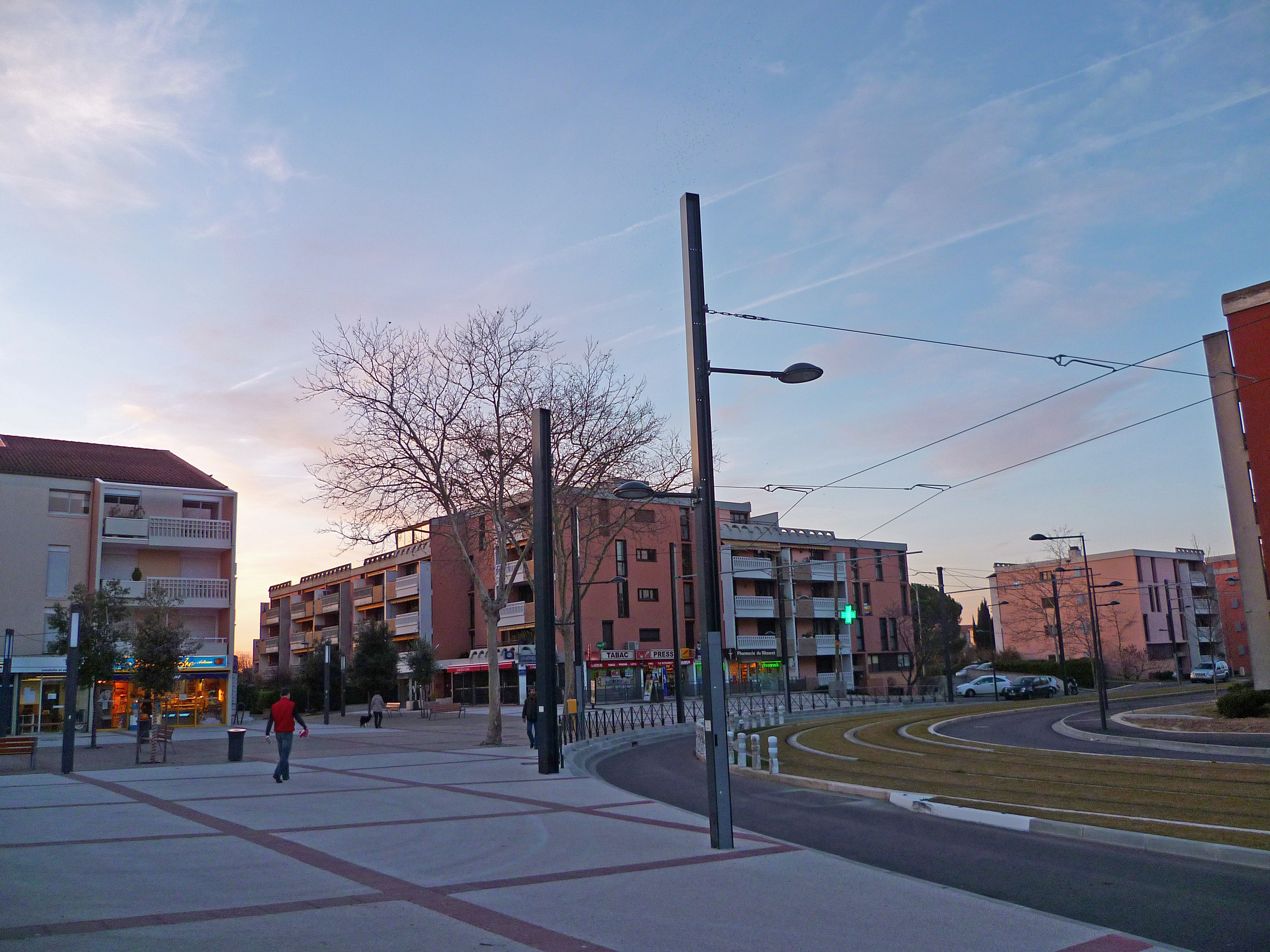
- Avenue Les Pins in Blagnac

- Coat of arms
- Location of Blagnac
- Location within France Location within Occitanie
- Coordinates: 43°38′11″N 1°23′26″E
- Country: France
- Region: Occitania
- Department: Haute-Garonne
- Arrondissement: Toulouse
- Canton: Blagnac
- Intercommunality: Toulouse Métropole

Government
  - Mayor (2020–2026): Joseph Carles
- Area^{1}: 16.88 km^{2} (6.52 sq mi)
- Elevation: 135 m (443 ft)
- Highest elevation: 153 m (502 ft)
- Lowest elevation: 119 m (390 ft)
- Population (2023): 27,604
  - Density: 1,635/km^{2} (4,235/sq mi)
- Time zone: UTC+01:00 (CET)
  - Summer (DST): UTC+02:00 (CEST)
- INSEE/Postal code: 31069 /31700
- ^{1} French Land Register data, which excludes lakes, ponds, glaciers > 1 km^{2} (0.386 sq mi or 247 acres) and river estuaries.

Blagnac (French pronunciation: [blaɲak]; Occitan: Blanhac, pronounced [ˈblaɲak]) is a commune of the greater Toulouse area in the department of Haute-Garonne, and the region of Occitania, southwestern France. The city hosts the aviation museum Aeroscopia and the corporate headquarters and major manufacturing operations of Airbus.

It is the third-largest suburb of the city of Toulouse, although governed by a separate council, and is adjacent to it on the northwest side. It is a member of the Toulouse Métropole.

== History ==
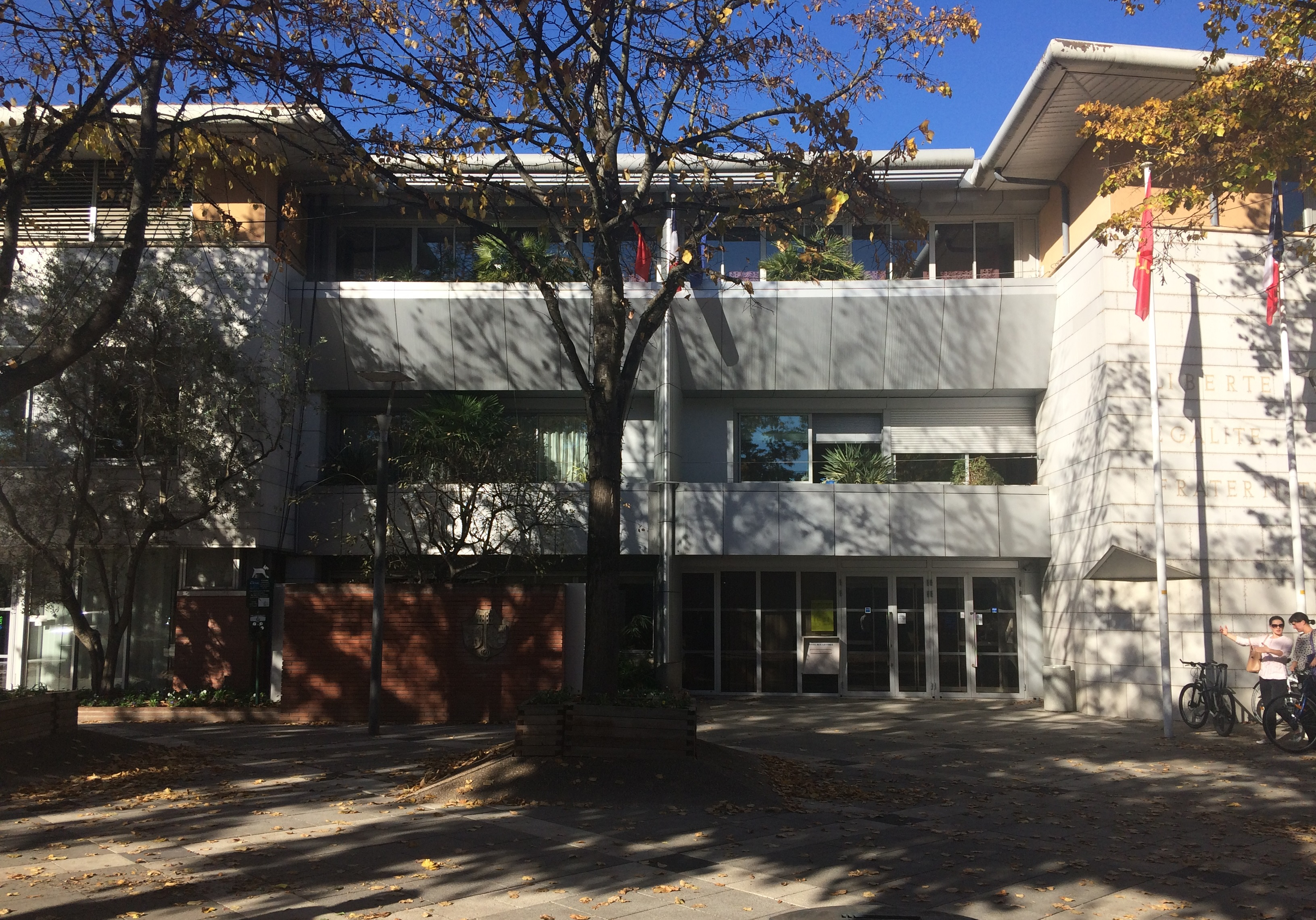
The Hôtel de Ville

The Hôtel de Ville was completed in summer 1992.

== Geography ==
The river Touch forms part of the commune's southern border, then flows into the Garonne, which forms all of its eastern border.

38% percent of the area is made up of green spaces, mainly along the river Garonne and in parks.

== Population ==
Historical population

Year	Pop.	±% p.a.
1793	1,118	—
1800	1,062	−0.73%
1806	1,252	+2.78%
1821	1,416	+0.82%
1831	1,436	+0.14%
1836	1,538	+1.38%
1841	1,597	+0.76%
1846	1,680	+1.02%
1851	1,681	+0.01%
1856	1,652	−0.35%
1861	1,683	+0.37%
1866	1,729	+0.54%
1872	1,741	+0.12%
1876	1,831	+1.27%
1881	1,909	+0.84%
1886	1,897	−0.13%
1891	1,866	−0.33%
1896	1,791	−0.82%
1901	1,786	−0.06%

Year	Pop.	±% p.a.
1906	1,756	−0.34%
1911	1,880	+1.37%
1921	1,791	−0.48%
1926	1,975	+1.98%
1931	2,103	+1.26%
1936	2,360	+2.33%
1946	2,754	+1.56%
1954	3,543	+3.20%
1962	5,320	+5.21%
1968	8,417	+7.95%
1975	11,651	+4.75%
1982	14,929	+3.61%
1990	17,209	+1.79%
1999	20,586	+2.01%
2007	21,194	+0.36%
2012	22,983	+1.63%
2017	24,517	+1.30%
2023	27,604	+2.00%

Source: EHESS and INSEE (1968–2023)

== Economy ==
Airbus and ATR have their head offices in Blagnac. Mecachrome, a diversified precision engineering company with extensive experience in motorsport, has its headquarters in the commune.

== Education ==
Blagnac has a student capacity of 5,500 in seven nurseries (écoles maternelles), five primary schools, two high schools/junior high schools (collèges), one sixth form college/senior high school (lycée), and a private school.

Public secondary schools:

- Collège Mermoz
- Collège Henry-Guillaume
- Lycée Saint-Exupéry

The private school is Établissement Le Ferradou, serving primary through senior high.

The European aircraft manufacturer Airbus has also one of its eight worldwide training centres : Airbus Training Centre Europe.

== Transport ==
The commune is served by Toulouse–Blagnac Airport which can be accessed by car and bus.

Local transport is operated by Tisséo. Buses 70 and 71 run to Jeanne d'Arc (connection with Line B of the Toulouse Metro) and bus 66 runs to St Cyprien République (connection with Line A), both in the city centre. Bus 25 circles the suburb and stops at the airport, and bus 17 connects Blagnac to Mondonville, toward the northwest. A shuttlebus (navette) connects the Airport to the city centre. A new tramway now operates southwards to the Toulouse Arènes station where it connects with Line A of the Metro.

== Car attack ==
On 10 November 2017 a man drove into three students, aged between 22 and 23, outside their college. One was in a serious condition. It was thought the driver was suffering from major psychological problems. A public prosecutor at the time said there was no evidence the attack was linked to terrorism.

== See also ==
- Blagnac SCR
- Blagnac FC
- Communes of the Haute-Garonne department
