= Lycée Saint-Exupéry (Blagnac) =

Public high school in Blagnac, France

Lycée Saint-Exupéry is a senior high school/sixth-form college in Blagnac, Haute-Garonne, France, in the Toulouse Métropole.

It was established in 2004 with 550 students; the enrollment reached 1,200 by 2007. As of 2015 it had 1,785 students.
