= Falcon Field (Arizona) =

Airport in Maricopa County, Arizona

Falcon Field Falcon Field Army Airfield
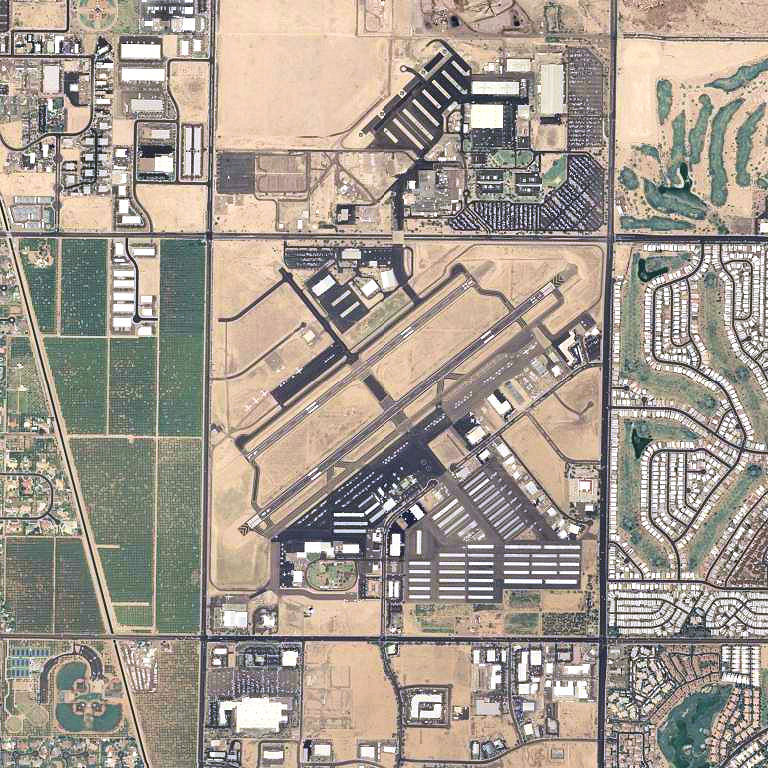
- USGS 2006 orthophoto
- IATA: MSC; ICAO: KFFZ; FAA LID: FFZ

Summary
- Airport type: Public
- Owner: City of Mesa
- Serves: Mesa, Arizona
- Elevation AMSL: 1,394 ft (425 m)
- Coordinates: 33°27′39″N 111°43′42″W
- Website: www.falconfieldairport.com

Map
- Location of airport in Arizona / United States FFZ (the United States)

Runways
| Direction | Length | | Surface |
| Direction | ft | m | Surface |
|---|---|---|---|
| 4R/22L | 5,101 | 1,555 | Asphalt |
| 4L/22R | 3,799 | 1,158 | Asphalt |

Helipads
| Number | Length | | Surface |
| Number | ft | m | Surface |
|---|---|---|---|
| H1 | 60 | 18 | Asphalt |
| H2 | 60 | 18 | Asphalt |

Statistics
- Aircraft operations (2008): 319,419
- Based aircraft (2017): 646
- Source: Federal Aviation Administration

Falcon Field (IATA: MSC, ICAO: KFFZ, FAA LID: FFZ) is an airport located in Maricopa County, Arizona. It was originally built 6 miles (5.2 nmi; 9.7 km) northeast of Mesa, which later included, and owns it. The National Plan of Integrated Airport Systems for 2017–2021 categorized it as a reliever airport. Scheduled service to Bullhead City on Western Express Air ended in January 2007.

Most U.S. airports use the same three-letter location identifier for the FAA and IATA, but Falcon Field is FFZ to the FAA and MSC to the IATA.

== History ==
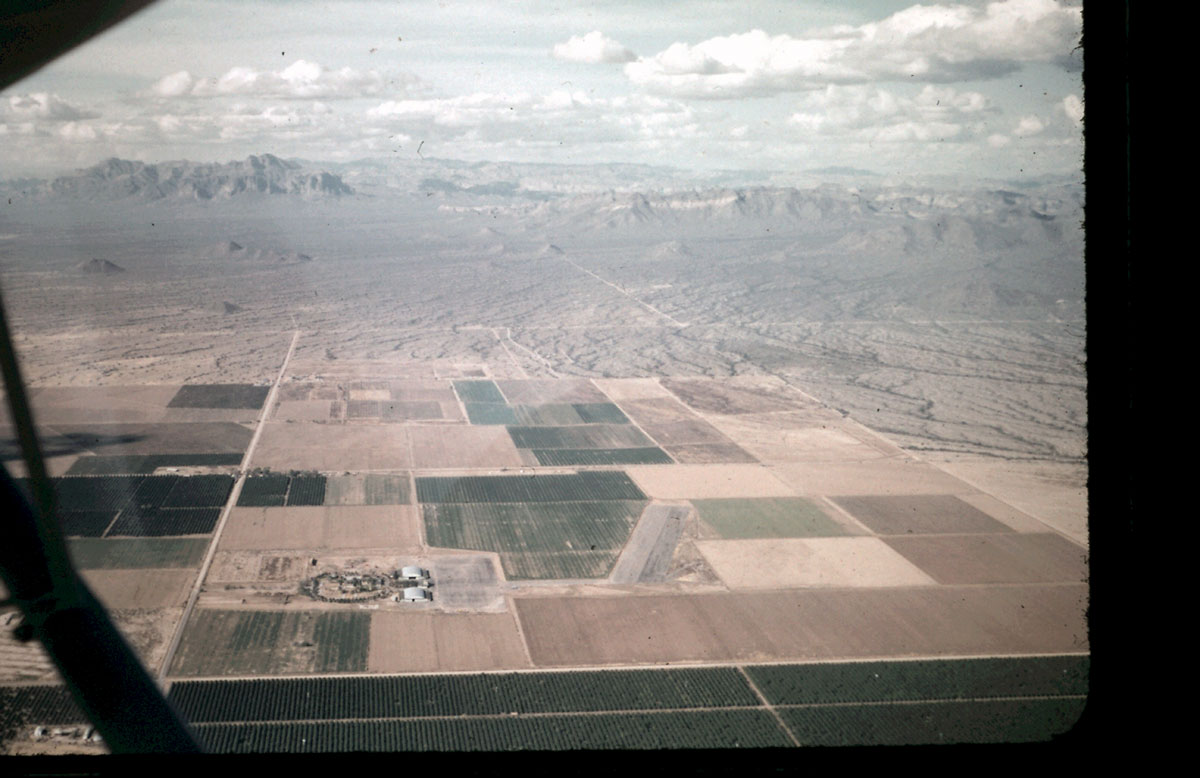
Falcon Field in 1955

Falcon Field got its start before World War II when Hollywood producer Leland Hayward and pilot John H. "Jack" Connelly founded Southwest Airways with funding from friends including Henry Fonda, Fred Astaire, Ginger Rogers, James Stewart, and Hoagy Carmichael. Southwest Airways operated two other airfields in Arizona – Thunderbird Field No. 1 (which became the site of Arizona Christian University) and Thunderbird Field No. 2 (which became the site of Scottsdale Airport) – to train pilots from China, Russia and 24 other Allied nations. Falcon was to be Thunderbird Field III and would train British pilots.

However, the British said they would like the field to be named after one of their birds, and thus Falcon Field opened as the No. 4 British Flying Training School (BFTS). There were six BFTS airfields in the U.S., in Florida, Oklahoma, Texas, California and Arizona.

The groundbreaking ceremony for Falcon Field was held at 10:30am on July 16, 1941. Mesa, Arizona mayor, George Nicholas Goodman, and Arizona governor, Sidney P. Osbone, dug the first shovels of dirt.

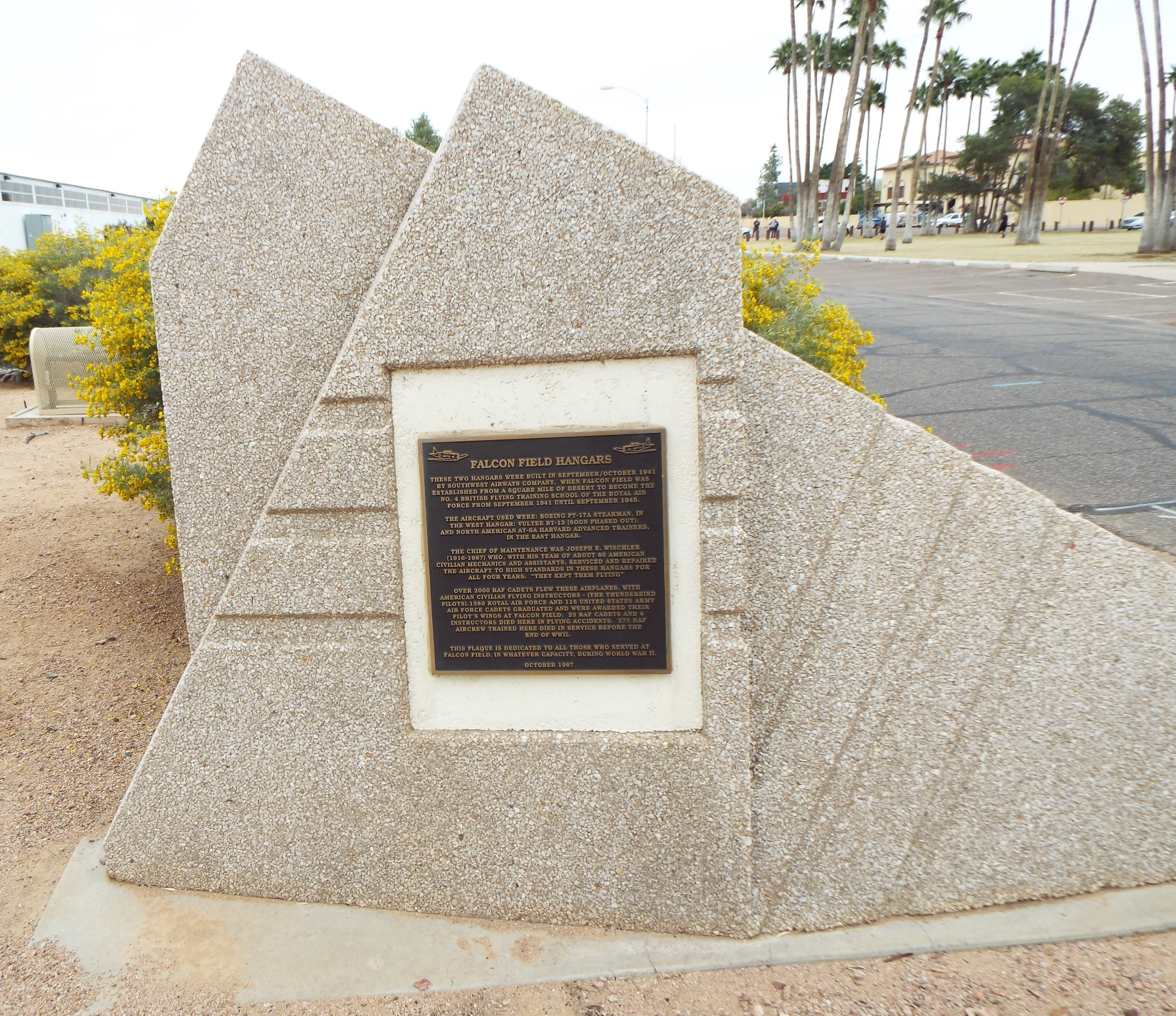
Falcon Field World War II aviation hangars plaque

In September 1941 the first cadets of the Royal Air Force arrived. They trained in Stearman PT-17s and North American Aviation AT-6s. The good weather, wide-open desert terrain, and lack of enemy airpower provided safer and more efficient training than was possible in England. Even so, twenty-three British cadets, one American cadet and four instructors were killed and are buried in the Mesa City Cemetery, along with several colleagues who have since died of natural causes. Several thousand pilots were trained there until the RAF installation was closed at the end of the war. The City of Mesa purchased the field from the U.S. government for $1.

From 1945 to 1965 the field was leased out to industrial interests, including Talley Defense Systems, Astro Rocket Inc., Rocket Power Inc., the Gabriel Company and others.

Eventually it became a civil airfield, owned and operated by the city of Mesa. Falcon Field is the home of CAE Oxford Aviation Academy, the largest flight school in the world. Student pilots from Japan, Belgium, The Netherlands, the UK, Italy, Turkey, Mexico and Vietnam fly out of Falcon Field. Since 1976 Falcon Field has been the home of Airbase Arizona, one of the largest units in the Commemorative Air Force (CAF) which operates a flying B-17G "Sentimental Journey" and a B-25J "Maid in the Shade" among other aircraft. On May 19, 2016, the Falcon Field World War II Aviation Hangars were listed in the National Register of Historic Places, reference #16000266.

== Adjacent Boeing heliport ==
The Boeing Company operates a heliport (FAA LID: AZ81) and factory adjacent to Falcon Field, known as the Boeing Mesa Facility. Boeing uses the facility to manufacture and maintain the AH-64 Apache military helicopter.

== Other services ==
Local companies:

- Alliant Techsystems (ATK)
- Boeing
- AvFlight
- Lockheed Martin
- Marsh Aviation
- MD Helicopters
- Nammo Talley
- Semflex
- Special Devices Inc.
- Timken
- Trans-Matic
- Wal-Mart
- GECO Inc.

Local groups:

- Falcon Field Area Alliance (FFAA)
- Falcon Field Tenants & Users Association
- Civil Air Patrol - Falcon Composite Squadron 305
- Mesa Police Department - Air Support Unit

Local museums:

- Arizona Commemorative Air Force Museum

Flight Schools:

- CAE Phoenix
- ATP Flight School
- Red Rock Flight School

== Accidents and incidents ==
- On 5 November, 2024, a private Honda HA-420 Hondajet crashed into a car that was driving outside the airport, during an attempted take off. Five people were killed. The FAA is investigating the accident.

== In popular culture ==
Several scenes of the 1980 aerobatics film Cloud Dancer were filmed at this airport.

== See also ==
- 36th Flying Training Wing (World War II)
- Arizona World War II Army Airfields
- Arizona Commemorative Air Force Museum
- Army Aviation Heritage Foundation and Flying Museum
- List of airports in Arizona
