= Rungis =

- Commune
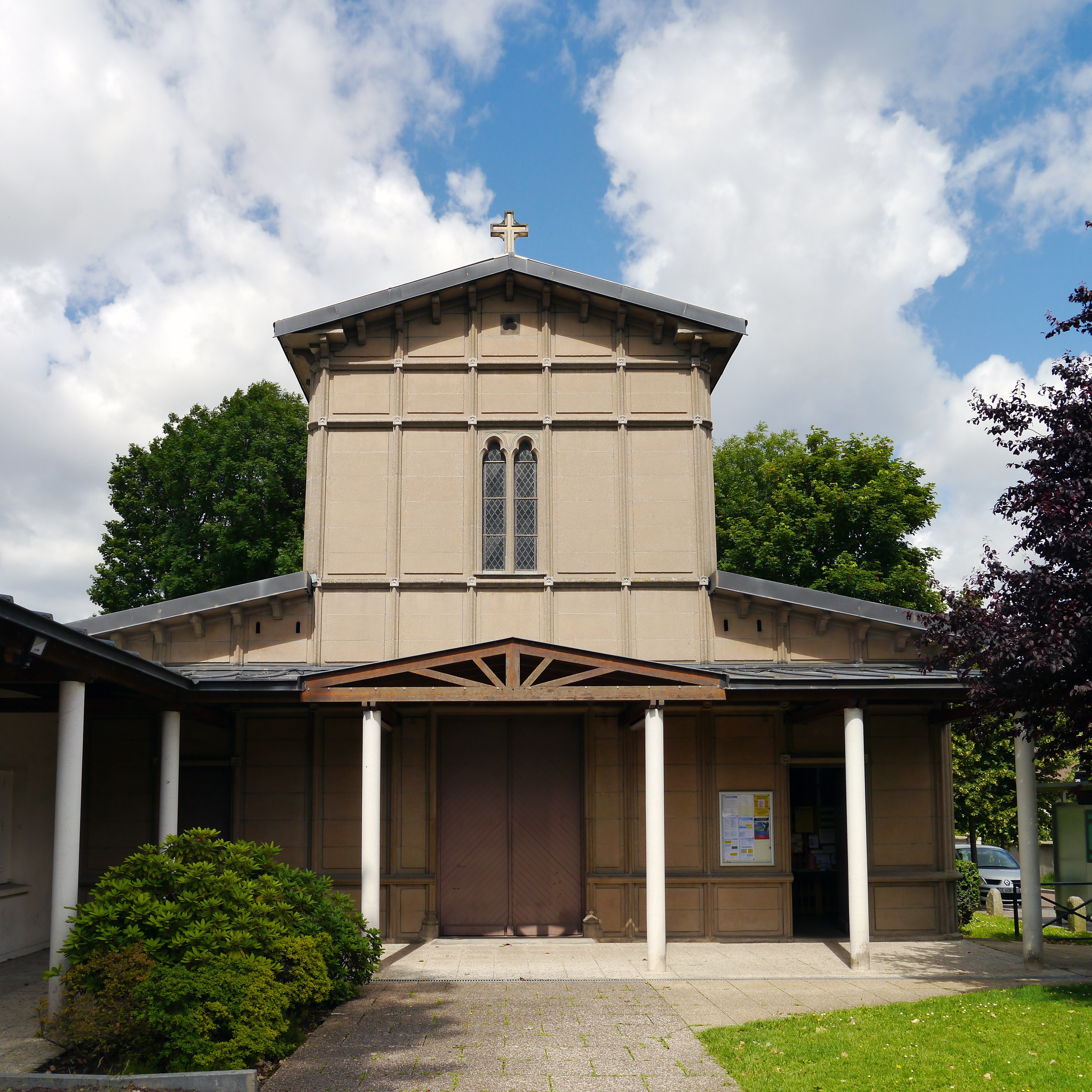
- The church of Notre-Dame-de-l'Assomption of Rungis

- Coat of arms

- Location (in red) within Paris inner suburbs
- Location of Rungis
- Location within France Location within Île-de-France (region)
- Coordinates: 48°44′54″N 2°20′59″E
- Country: France
- Region: Île-de-France
- Department: Val-de-Marne
- Arrondissement: L'Haÿ-les-Roses
- Canton: Thiais
- Intercommunality: Grand Paris

Government
  - Mayor (2026–32): Bruno Marcillaud
- Area^{1}: 4.2 km^{2} (1.6 sq mi)
- Elevation: 80 m (260 ft)
- Highest elevation: 90 m (300 ft)
- Lowest elevation: 58 m (190 ft)
- Population (2023): 5,611
  - Density: 1,300/km^{2} (3,500/sq mi)
- Time zone: UTC+01:00 (CET)
  - Summer (DST): UTC+02:00 (CEST)
- INSEE/Postal code: 94065 /94150
- ^{1} French Land Register data, which excludes lakes, ponds, glaciers > 1 km^{2} (0.386 sq mi or 247 acres) and river estuaries.

Rungis (French pronunciation: [ʁœ̃ʒis]) is a commune in the southern suburbs of Paris, France, in the department of Val-de-Marne, Île-de-France.

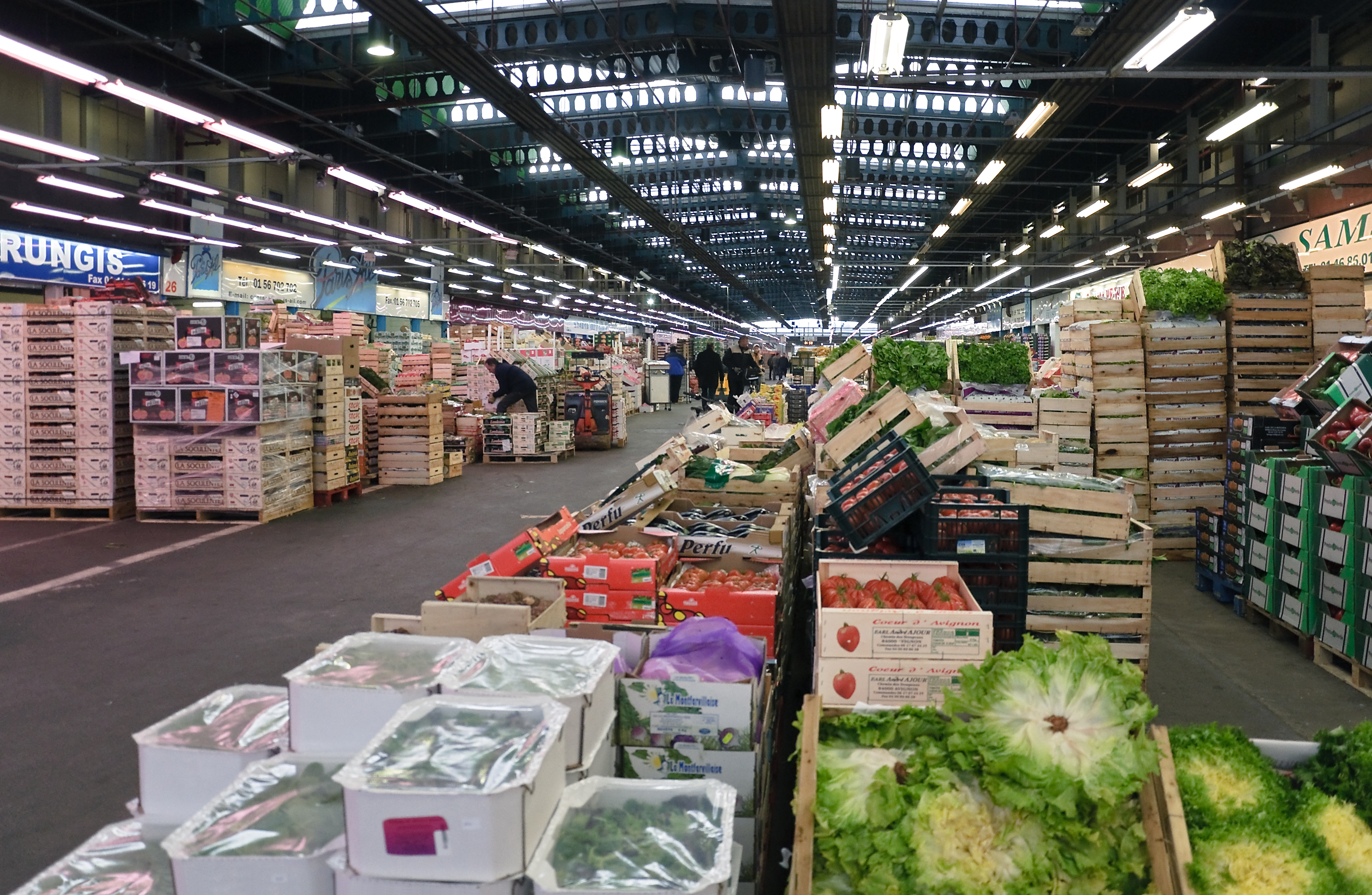
In the Rungis International Market

It is best known as the location of the Marché d'Intérêt National de Rungis, a large wholesale food market serving the Paris metropolitan area and beyond, said to be the largest food market in the world.

The name Rungis was recorded for the first time in a royal charter of 1124 as Rungi Villa.

== Economy ==
Rungis is the home base for the headquarters of the Système U supermarket cooperative, Corsair International (previously Corsairfly) and HOP! airlines, and MGA Entertainment's France division.

Prior to its disestablishment, Air Liberté was headquartered in Rungis. Airlinair previously had its head office in Rungis. In 2013 Airlinair merged into HOP!

== Transport ==
Rungis is located 11.6 km (7.2 mi). (7.2 miles) from the center of Paris and 2 km (1.2 mi) from Orly Airport, at the junction of the A6 and RN7.

Rungis is served by Rungis – La Fraternelle station on Paris RER line C.

== Population ==
Historical population
Year	Pop.	±% p.a.
1968	2,686	—
1975	2,986	+1.52%
1982	2,649	−1.70%
1990	2,939	+1.31%
1999	5,424	+7.05%
2007	5,618	+0.44%
2012	5,691	+0.26%
2017	5,611	−0.28%
2023	5,611	+0.00%
Source: INSEE

== Education ==
The community has two preschools (écoles maternelles), Médicis and Les Sources; two elementary schools, Les Antes and La Grange; and one junior high school, collège les Closeaux.

Post-secondary education:

- Institut aéronautique Jean Mermoz

== See also ==
- Les Halles
- Communes of the Val-de-Marne department
