= CAE Inc. =

Canadian aerospace company

- Formerly: Canadian Aviation Electronics Ltd. (1947–1965); CAE Industries Ltd. (1965–1993)
- Type: Public
- Traded as: TSX: CAE; NYSE: CAE; S&P/TSX 60 component
- Industry: Aerospace
- Founded: March 17, 1947
- Headquarters: 8585 Chemin de la Côte-de-Liesse, Saint-Laurent, Quebec
- Revenue: ▲US$4.282 billion (2024)
- Operating income: ▼US$−185.4 million (2024)
- Net income: ▼US$−325.3 million (2024)
- Total assets: ▼US$9.834 billion (2024)
- Total equity: ▼US$4.302 billion (2024)
- Number of employees: 13,000 (2025)
- Divisions: Civil Aviation Training Solutions, Defence & Security, Aviation Software
- Website: www.cae.com www.flightscape.com

CAE Inc. is a Canadian manufacturer of simulation technologies, modelling technologies and training services to airlines, aircraft manufacturers, and defence customers. CAE was founded in 1947, and has manufacturing operations and training facilities in 35 countries.

== Flight simulators ==
CAE sells flight simulators and training devices to airlines, aircraft manufacturers and training centres. It licenses its simulation software to various market segments and has a professional services division.

The simulators include basic training devices CAE 400XR and CAE 500XR, and full-motion products such as the CAE 3000, CAE 5000 and CAE 7000XR. These simulators are available for commercial use. In 2016, the company sold 53 Full-Flight Simulators.

In 2001, CAE Inc. acquired BAE Systems's Flight Simulation and Training division, formerly known as Reflectone Inc, a publicly listed company founded in 1939, and based in Tampa, Florida. Reflectone sold flight simulators to the military and provided pilot training on its premises.

In 2021, CAE announced the purchase of the Military Training businesses of L3Harris Technologies; the purchase includes Link Simulation & Training which traces its corporate history to the original flight simulators designed and built by Ed Link.

== Aviation training ==
CAE conducts airline pilot training and business jet pilot training in its 50 aviation training centres worldwide.

In the United States, the firm is a supplier of initial and recurrency training for airlines such as JetBlue and non-airline based companies, including charter and cargo operators. In December 2001, the firm acquired Simuflite training centers in Dallas, Texas, and Morristown, New Jersey, which are now called CAE SimuFlite. The facility at Dallas/Fort Worth International Airport is the largest business aviation training facility in the world at 426,000 sq ft (39,600 m^{2}), with 34 simulators and approximately 450 employees.

In February 2016, CAE Inc. acquired one of its competitors, Lockheed Martin Commercial Flight Training, formerly known as Sim-Industries.

CAE also operates the CAE Oxford Aviation Academy, the largest ab initio flight training network in the world, with a fleet of over 220 aircraft and seven campuses worldwide, CAE Global Academy Phoenix, and Sabena Flight Academy in Belgium.

As of February 2020, CAE also works together with Airways Aviation Academy, formerly known as ESMA of Montpellier, France, for training students from Oxford and Brussels.

In October 2024, CAE commenced a multi-year contract with Nav Canada to deliver initial training to some of their air traffic controllers and flight service specialists at their Montreal facility. This training is delivered by former Nav Canada employees as well as air traffic controllers hired from international Air navigation service providers.

== Aviation Software ==
In March 2022, CAE acquired Sabre Corporation's AirCentre product portfolio and associated services team in a deal valued at $392.5 million. In May 2025, CAE rebranded its suite of airline operations solutions under a new name: Flightscape – Powered by CAE and launched a dedicated website designed to promote and commercialise its aviation solutions portfolio.

== Healthcare ==
In 2011, CAE purchased Medical Education Technologies Inc. (METI), a Sarasota-based company known for its patient simulator, the HPS. In October 2023, CAE announced the sale of its Healthcare business to Chicago-based Madison Industries for an enterprise value of C$311 million, subject to customary adjustments.

== Publications ==
In September 2021, with the UK P&I Club and Witherbys, CAE launched a safety publication entitled Maritime Team Dynamics, a safety book comparing aviation and maritime incidents.

== Leadership ==
=== President ===
1. Kenneth Albert Wilson (provisional), March 20, 1947
2. Roy Robertson, March 20, 1947 – early 1951
3. Calixa-Narcisse Moisan, early 1951 – June 1951
4. Kenneth Roland Patrick, June 1951 – January 1958
5. James Francis Tooley, January 1958 – April 27, 1967
6. Charles Douglas Reekie, April 27, 1967 – October 2, 1985
7. David Humphrey Race, October 2, 1985 – June 10, 1993
8. John Edward Caldwell, June 10, 1993 – October 1, 1999
9. Derek Hudson Burney, October 1, 1999 – August 12, 2004
10. Robert Ellis Brown, August 12, 2004 – September 30, 2009
11. Marc Parent, September 30, 2009 – August 13, 2025
12. Matthew Fox Bromberg, August 13, 2025 – present

=== Chairman of the Board ===
1. Calixa-Narcisse Moisan, June 1951 – March 5, 1954 †
2. Wilfrid Gagnon, October 4, 1954 – June 1961
3. Roy Fraser Elliott, June 1961 – June 10, 1993
4. David Humphrey Race, June 10, 1993 – June 16, 1999
5. Lynton Ronald Wilson, June 16, 1999 – August 14, 2013
6. James Floyd Hankinson, August 14, 2013 – August 14, 2018
7. John Paul Manley, August 14, 2018 – February 14, 2025
8. Alan Nelson MacGibbon, August 10, 2022 – February 14, 2025
9. Călin Rovinescu, February 14, 2025 – present
