= Certificat de formation à la sécurité =

French national degree

The Certificat de formation à la sécurité (CFS) (in English Safety training certificate) is the French national degree required to be a flight attendant in France. It replaces the Certificat de Sécurité Sauvetage (CSS) since the 16th of July 2008. It consists of a theoretical and a practical part.

== Theoretical part ==
The safety part (Modules: A-10, B-20, C-30, E-50, F-60, H-80) covers the following topics: aeronautical knowledge, regulation, equipment safety regulatory, safety, dangerous goods, communication, resource management (CRM), general instructions in normal flight, general instructions in an emergency and survival.

The First Aid part (Module: D-40) covers the following topics : basics of anatomy and physiology, aviation and reactions of the organism, the role of the cabin crew, onboard incidents, bleeding - circulatory - respiratory distress, the abdominal pathologies and traumatic, burns, childbirth, tropical diseases and triage.

== Practical part ==
The safety part covers the following topics : knowledge and use of emergency equipment, running in the fumes / off lights, swimming pool training, rescue equipment vest, towing, boarding boats, use of life jackets and canoes / Signalling Tools / Survival, passenger management, communication and practiced CRM.

The First Aid part covers the following topics: case studies related to emergencies, seat extraction, cardiopulmonary resuscitation manikin, treatment of bleeding and fractures, splints and bandages, using of the first aid kit.
