= International Association of Aviation Personnel Schools =

Aviation education network

The International Association of Aviation Personnel Schools (formerly the European Association of Aviation Pilot Schools) is a worldwide association of pilot schools. The organization was created on 25 October 1995, and was later renamed in 2009 to also include aviation schools not located in Europe.

The IAAPS is recognized by various national and international aviation authorities. The association is also part of the rulemaking group of the European Aviation Safety Agency (EASA). The organization currently represents 25 member schools and puts forward goals to improve the quality of pilot studies and to represent the schools in the official administrations, including the Civil Aviation Authority, and the European Aviation Safety Agency (EASA). It is also supported by European aircraft manufacturer Airbus, which organizes many of the logistical aspects the association, including Airbus headquarters.

== History ==
The European Joint Aviation Authority (JAA) was originally formed as a direct result of the implementation of the so-called "Cyprus Agreement" in 1990. In 1995, the European Association of Airline Pilot Schools (EAAPS) was established.

The EAAPS was active in the pan-European project to define and standardize the depth and scope of flight training within the JAA. As a result, the "Joint Aviation Requirement Flight Crew Licensing Code" (JAR-FCL) was established. The name of the organization was changed to the IAAPS in 2009 after becoming a worldwide association.

== Mission ==
As a global pilot shortage grows, members of the IIAPS work together to maintain and improve the quality standards of pilot training. Aviation training improves air safety standards.

The IAAPS is recognized by the EASA as a representative of the flight training industry. Memberships of the IAAPS include that of the EASA Advisory Board, the Safety Standards Consultative Committee, Subject Expert Team (SET), the Theoretical Knowledge Steering Group and the Human Factors Steering Group.

The IAAPS helped to develop "learning objectives" for aircraft and helicopters. These developments were published by the Joint Aviation Authorities and later by the European Aviation Safety Agency.

== Members ==
The association includes 24 member schools in 14 countries. Each member organization is certified nationally. The international membership is currently expanding. Member flight schools include:

- Austria
  - AeronautX Luftfahrtschule gmbH
- Belgium
  - Ben-air Flight Academy
  - Sabena Flight Academy
- Croatia
  - Croatia Aviation Training Center
- Finland
  - Finnish Aviation Academy
- France
  - Airbus Training Division
  - École de Pilotage Amaury de La Grange
  - École Nationale de l'aviation Civile
  - ESMA Aviation Academy
  - Institut aéronautique Jean Mermoz
- Germany
  - Lufthansa Flight Training Academy
  - Erband Deutsche Verkehrsfliegerschule
- Greece
  - Egnatia Aviation
  - Mesogeion Aeroclub
- Morocco
  - École Nationale des Pilotes de Ligne
- Netherlands
  - EPST
  - KLM Flight Academy
  - CAE Global Academy
  - Amsterdam Nationale Luchtvaart School
  - Stella Aviation Academy.
- Spain
  - Asociación de Escuelas de Formación Aeronáutica
  - Flight Training Europe.
- Sweden
  - European Flight Training Academy
  - Scandinavian Aviation Academy
- Switzerland
  - Swiss Aviation Training
  - IKON Aerospace Center
- Turkey
  - ER-AH Aviation Commerce
- United Kingdom
  - London Metropolitan University
  - Oxford Aviation Academy
