= Metron =

Metron may refer to:

- Metron (character), DC Comics character
- Metron (skipper), a genus of butterflies in the grass skipper family
- Metron, a fictional species in Star Trek: The Original Series
- Metron Aviation, an air traffic flow management company
- Metron (company), a Swiss architecture and planning firm
- Metron of Pydna, a general of Alexander the Great
- Metron S, a synonym for Iproheptine, an antihistamine
- Metron, a typeface for Prague Metro by Jiří Rathouský
- Metron (poetry), plural metra, a 3 or 4-syllable repeating section of a poetic metre
- Metron, an international journal of statistics founded in 1920 by Italian statistician Corrado Gini
- Metron, in Heim theory, a (two-dimensional) quantum of (multidimensional) space, a unit of measure
- A trio of characters in the Heisei Ultraseven universe
