= Airbus ProSky =

- Founded: January 2011
- Key people: Eric Stefanello, Paul-Franck Bijou

Airbus ProSky was an Airbus subsidiary dedicated to improving the performance of global air traffic management (ATM) prior to Airbus merging it with Airbus LUCEM and NAVTECH to form Navblue. Composed of ATM experts and offering various solutions to enhance air traffic capacity, efficiency and safety, Airbus ProSky works with air navigation service providers (ANSP), aircraft operators, airport authorities and Civil Aviation Authorities.

== History ==
Airbus ProSky was launched in January 2011 by Eric Stefanello, Senior Vice-president of ATM who became President of the company since its creation. Its first initiative was a Momorendum of Understanding with China Air Traffic Management Bureau (ATMB) in order to cooperate in ATM modernization. In July 2011, Airbus acquired Metron Aviation, Inc which became part of the Airbus ProSky group. In October 2012, Airbus announced the integration of Quovadis, its Performance Based Navigation subsidiary into Airbus ProSky. Airbus ProSky has also partnered with ATRiCS, a German-based company providing surface management solutions.

== Management team ==
In 2013, Paul-Franck Bijou became CEO of Airbus ProSky after Eric Stefanello. In 2014, he also became CEO of Metron Aviation, Inc.

== ATM Programs ==
Airbus ProSky is involved in many SESAR initiatives and has delivered several SESAR Joint Undertaking (SESAR JU) projects. These projects, co-financed by the industry and by the European Commission, have helped defining the future of ATM technology and Airbus ProSky continues to invest in such program.

== Solutions ==
=== Air Traffic Flow Management ===
Airbus ProSky commercializes the Metron "Harmony" system, an Air Traffic Flow Management and Collaborative Decision Making solution. Prior to Airbus' acquisition of Metron Aviation, Harmony was deployed in Australia and South Africa.

In South Africa, Metron Aviation's ATFM system has reduced air travel delays and helped air traffic and navigation services (ATNS), the country's ANSP, manage record traffic and passenger volumes during the 2010 World Cup. The ATNS business case to implement ATFM was successful with Harmony providing US$1.2 million in fuel savings per year for every one-minute reduction of runway holding. The system was so effective that it was awarded the Enabling Technology Award by Jane's Airport Review.

Airservices Australia has also commissioned Metron Aviation's award-winning ATFM system, Metron Harmony, demonstrating the benefits of technology to address the capacity constraints of global air traffic growth. ATFM indeed optimizes the use of existing airport and airspace resources through a CDM solution that helps airlines and air navigation service providers (ANSPs) share operational data to maximize the efficiency of the entire system.

In Australia, after two months of operations, Airservices Australia estimates the system has cut airborne holding by approximately 33 percent and produced fuel savings of US$6.5 million in Sydney alone, while average flight times have been reduced by five minutes per flight on the Melbourne-Sydney city pair, equating to over 40,000 metric tons of reduced CO_{2} per year.

In February 2014, Aerocivil Colombia, the national ANSP of Colombia, awarded Airbus ProSky (Metron Aviation) for the implementation of ATFM & CDM in Colombia. During the World ATM Congress, SENEAM, the Mexican ANSP also announced the first phase of ATFM implementation thanks to Metron Harmony.

Airbus ProSky has been involved in various ATFM initiatives with major Air Traffic Management entities such as the Civil Aviation Authority of Singapore, Hong-Kong and China ATMB.

=== Performance Based Navigation ===
==== Procedures ====
Since the beginning of Quovadis that was later integrated into Airbus ProSky, 50 Performance Based Navigation (PBN) projects were delivered by Airbus ProSky. Airbus ProSky has worked in various places and continues to be very active in supporting PBN.

Since 2010, Airbus ProSky has been very active in China and has designed Required Navigation Performance (RNP) procedures in Ali, Lhassa, Bangda, Rigatse, Linzhi, Li Jiang, Liping, Kangding, Xian and many other airports.

In 2011, Airbus ProSky also worked on RNP procedures in Kathmandu, Sanya, Kochi, and started to work on Cape Town airport RNP procedures. Since then, Airbus ProSky has delivered procedures in Vagar, Abu Dhabi, San Salvador, Guatemala City, Bangdung, Riga, Lanzarote and many other airports.

==== Operational Approval ====
Airbus ProSky also assist airlines in getting operational approval for RNP or RNP AR approaches.

=== Airport Solutions ===
With ATRiCS, Airbus ProSky proposes surface Management and Airport-CDM solutions.
