= List of Heisei Ultraseven characters =

This is a list of characters for the tokusatsu spin-off Heisei Ultraseven, taking place in an alternate universe wherein the events of Ultraseven is depicted as a standalone instalment and branched from the Showa Era Ultra Series continuity.

== Protagonists ==
=== Ultraseven/Dan Moroboshi ===
Returning from his titular series, Ultraseven (ウルトラセブン, Urutorasebun) is an alien from Nebula M78, who previously fought alongside the original members of Ultra Guard against alien invasions under his human guise, Dan Moroboshi (モロボシ・ダン, Moroboshi Dan).

After leaving the Earth once Pandon was properly killed, Seven returned and crashed to the planet when he was attacked by a pair of Alien Pitts, wherein his comatose body is put under protection by TDF and the new generation of Ultra Guard led by Furuhashi. Seven reawakened after receiving enough solar energy to recharge himself and defending the Earth once more from recurring alien invasions. While Dan would occasionally crosses paths with Furuhashi and Shiragane's generation of Ultra Guard, he also took on the form of the team member Kazamori to blend in with the team, especially during the events of Friendship Plan. Seeing the horrors of TDF's actions, Kaji's downfall into a war hawk and mankind's true nature as descendants of invaders, Dan was initially disillusioned with his role as their protector until the revived Furuhashi encourages him to trust in his people, eventually leading into a decision where Seven jeopardizes his neutral stance to allow mankind's broadcast of the Omega Files. He was trialed for his intervention in the Earth civil war and sentenced to be imprisoned in the Horsehead Nebula, until Satomi's life energy freed him from his jail, allowing Seven to bond with Kazamori and foil Alien Garut's plan for Earth domination.

In the novel adaptation, Seven's human alias as Dan Moroboshi retained his youthful appearance from his titular series. His decision to bond with Kazamori on the other hand was his decision to relive his youthfulness through the young human.

Kohji Moritsugu (森次晃嗣, Moritsugu Kōji) reprises his role as Dan Moroboshi, at the same time providing narration to Heisei Ultraseven. While Moritsugu also returns to provide the grunts for Ultraseven, Katsuyuki Yamazaki takes over the role in Evolution pentalogy to emphasize Kazamori's merger with the Ultra.

=== Shigeru Furuhashi ===
Also returning from Ultraseven, Shigeru Furuhashi (フルハシ・シゲル, Furuhashi Shigeru) is a former member of the original Ultra Guard, serving as their strongest member and had been active alongside Dan Moroboshi in their prime years. 30 years after Seven left the Earth and eventually returned in an injured state, Furuhashi had since been promoted into the rank of captain of the new Ultra Guard, leading the new members; Tōgō, Risa and Kaji into handling alien invasions. After Seven was revived and stopped the Alien Pitt's invasion, Furuhashi tried to find the Ultra's human form, Dan in the middle of the Alien Metron siblings' invasion plot. Years later in the 30th Anniversary Trilogy, Furuhashi was promoted to a staff officer of TDF's Far East Base branch and observed the progress of the new Ultra Guard under Shiragane's leadership. He reunited with Dan at the end of Bandelas' attack and when Seven was about to depart from Earth.

During The Final Chapters Hexalogy, Furuhashi was killed during his retirement day by Alien Valkyrie and had his name further tarnished when the alien tried to sabotage Kaji's Friendship Plan. Although his death was avenged by Seven not long after, Furuhashi was revived by the will of the universe to become a spectator of Earth's past and the ancient humans being invaders who overthrew the Nonmalt as the dominant race of their planet. This discovery made Dan/Seven hesitant, but Furuhashi's reassurance to believe in mankind inspired the Ultra to interfere in the civil war between mankind and the Nonmalt despite that doing so would lead to his banishment from his home planet. Although Furuhashi tried to compensate by offering Dan a place on Earth, his old friend choose to accept his punishment instead. Furuhashi was absent in the Evolution Pentalogy, but appeared in the series' novel adaptation as one of the TDF officers who spearheaded the reconstruction of TDF Far East Base.

Sandayu Dokumamushi (毒蝮 三太夫, Dokumamushi Sandayuu) reprised his role as the elderly Shigeru Furuhashi. Furuhashi's return in the final installment, I am an Earthling, was due to the staff members' dissatisfaction of the character's death in Legends and Glory.

=== Masaki Kazamori ===
Masaki Kazamori (カザモリ・マサキ, Kazamori Masaki) is a character in the Heisei Ultraseven, originally acting as a secondary character since the 30th Anniversary Trilogy before elevating to the main protagonist in Evolution pentalogy.

One of the new members of Shiragane's Ultra Guard, Kazamori occasionally crosses paths with Dan Moroboshi and ended up abducted for the Ultra to impersonate his identity in the midst of alien invasions. This culminated in Dan/Seven outright impersonating Kazamori for an entire year in The Final Chapters hexalogy ever since the Alien Valkyrie try to sow discord amongst TDF and Ultra Guard. Kazamori was stored in one of Dan's capsules as he was nursed back to health and returned to his teammates after the death of Zabangi.

In Evolution, Kazamori's time in recuperation provided him with psychokinetic abilities and mental link to the imprisoned Ultraseven, due to the Ultra's residual essence within himself. Although he had long retired from the Ultra Guard, Kazamori made his occasional intervention to save his former teammates from aliens posing as TDF officers and the Plant Life Form from both sides trying to capitalize her status. He eventually merges with the freed Ultraseven, using his newfound powers to fight off Alien Garut's influence before eventually killing the alien once and for all. With mankind's place in Earth's future secured, Kazamori left to parts unknown while swearing off to continue protecting Earth.

Masaki Kazamori is portrayed by Katsuyuki Yamazaki (山崎 勝之, Yamazaki Katsuyuki).

== UG/TDF ==
In Heisei Ultraseven, the Ultra Guard (ウルトラ警備隊, Urutora Keibitai) and Terrestrial Defense Force (地球防衛軍, Chikyū bōei-gun), abbreviated as UG (ユー・ジー, Yū Jī) and TDF respectively, were never disbanded after Seven's departure from Earth in the past. Most of the original members in the television series had retired or promoted at some point of time.

=== Ultra Guard ===
Ultra Guard members (1994)

The first new team of Ultra Guard was led by Furuhashi, consisting of three younger members, Tōgō, Risa and Kaji. Their sole appearances were in the television specials. In subsequent instalments, Tōgō and Risa were absent despite Kaji and Furuhashi's promotion into staff officers. The first episode of The Final Chapters Hexalogy implied an offscreen death of an Ultra Guard member.

- Shigeru Furuhashi: See above
- Tōgō (トーゴー): The cool-headed deputy captain of the Ultra Guard during Furuhashi's leadership. He is portrayed by Takashi Matsuyama (松山 鷹志, Matsuyama Takashi).
- Risa (リサ): The sole female member of the team during Furuhashi's leadership and is skilled in Shorinji Kempo. She is portrayed by Ami Suzuki (鈴木 亜美, Suzuki Ami).
- Kaji: See below

Ultra Guard members (1998-2002)

The new team of Ultra Guard was organized by Furuhashi at some point after his final mission with Kaji, as well as the two had been promoted to TDF satff officers. Organized by Furuhashi (who also observed the team's efforts, the team enlisted top officers from different departments and had their first mission against the invasion of Alien Variel. Due their close relationship with Furuhashi, they also objected to the Friendship Plan proposed by Kaji, but was forced to stand down when the latter assumed Furuhashi's position to monitor their activities. After Kaji was revealed to have done various shady operations regarding the Omega Files, the team announced their rebellion against the staff officer and broadcast the Omega File towards the outer space at Ultraseven's advise. In the Evolution Pentalogy, the Ultra Guard was due to be disbanded after TDF signed their peace treaty with the universal civilizations, but they opted to go rogue after discovering that aliens had been secretly invading the TDF Far East Base, forcing their members to operate on their own in addition to a handful of TDF officers led by Saijō.

- Sanshirō Shiragane (シラガネ・サンシロウ, Shiragane Sanshirō): The captain of the reorganized Ultra Guard, who was elected by the staff officer Furuhashi. Although a strict captain, he also acted as a responsible leader to his teammates. He was traumatized by the loss of his pregnant wife and their unborn child to a vehicular accident, due to being unavailable at the time as he was removing a bomb planted in TDF's Far East Base by an alien invader. This trauma was utilized by Alien Godola until Shiragane moved on from his wife's death and is the first to escape Godola's mental prison. He is portrayed by Kōji Nanjo (南条 弘二, Nanjo Kōji).
- Keisuke Shima (シマ・ケイスケ, Shima Keisuke): The reliable deputy leader of the team. His favorite food is the katsudon prepared by TDF's cafeteria and had bad memorizing skills. Shima lost his mother at a young age and his father abandoned him not long after, forcing him to be taken care of by his aunt in Tatsunomiya. He often butted heads with the more pacifistic Satomi, as well as due to his inability to memorize her name. In the Evolution Pentalogy, Shima's weakness was revealed to be his insecurity over his reliance on physical fitness. His false judgement of assuming the Plant Life Form to be an invader caused him to involuntarily steer Neo Pandon into a rampaging spree and killing the aforementioned creature despite her lack of hostile intentions. He is portrayed by Kunio Masaoka (正岡 邦夫, Masaoka Kunio).
- Takuma Mizuno (ミズノ・タクマ, Mizuno Takuma): The Ultra Guard's analyzer and maintenance officer, who used to be working at TDF's science department. In addition to his genius level intellect and affinity for research, he is also a skilled combatant and can pilot the Ultra Hawk with relative ease. He had once dated Saeko Hamuro, a disguised Alien Lemojo who took advantage of Mizuno's growing feelings for her by implanting a bug to spy on the TDF. In the Evolution Pentalogy, Mizuno's weakness is revealed to be his insecurity over human knowledge and how to use it during the Ultra Guard's fight against the alien invaders. He is portrayed by Wataru Koga (古賀 亘, Koga Wataru).
- Satomi Hayakawa (ハヤカワ・サトミ, Hayakawa Satomi): A female officer who served as Kazamori's senior in the team. Satomi became an Ultra Guard officer after being inspired by the novel The Sky Flying Iron Colossus written by Henmi Yoshiya (Alien Kyuru), a friend of her late father while being raised in her aunt's village. Because of her idealistic approach, she tends to butt heads with her deputy captain Shima. After the Omega File incident, Satomi retired from her service and spent her time writing a children storybook until she choose to participate in the Ultra Guard again, especially when the team went rogue from the TDF. She was killed by a stray bullet to protect a young girl, with her spirit utilized the help of the Dragonic Saucer to free Seven from his prison in Horsehead Nebula, allowing the Ultra to merge with Kazamori on Earth. She is portrayed by Kaoru Ukawa (鵜川 薫, Ukawa Kaoru).
- Rumi Honjō (ホンジョウ・ルミ, Honjō Rumi): The communication officer of Ultra Guard. As Rumi is less active in terms of physicality, she rarely joined the team in missions and prefer to stay behind in the base. She has a friendly relationship with Satomi and had once joined her in visiting her aunt's house. In the Evolution Pentalogy, Rumi was ordered to steal the Ultra Hawk 1 while her teammates were invading the alien-infested TDF Far East Base, hence being the only one (aside from Satomi) to be spared from Alien Godola's mental prison. She is portrayed by Rieko Adachi (あだち 理絵子, Adachi Rieko).
- Yuki Kisaragi (キサラギ・ユキ, Kisaragi Yuki): The latest addition to the Ultra Guard, joining the team during the events of Evolution Pentalogy. As a child, Yuki was a victim of child abuse and was raised by her caretaker Sayuri in an orphanage. This inspired her to join TDF in hopes of protecting the orphanage she was raised in. Four years prior to Evolution, she was part of TDF's special force led by Suwa to investigate the Urosu shrine and was the only one aside from her leader who made it out safely, at the cost of forgetting the incident due to an alien attack at that same time. She originally joined Shiragane's Ultra Guard under Inagaki's orders to act as the mole, until she abandoned her superior's orders to properly joining the team. In addition to participating in the destruction of TDF Far East Base, she was revealed to be a neo neuron human, whose transformation was a result of the Akashic Records to serve as a bridge for Kazamori to obtain the record's true copy and foiling Alien Garut's plan for Earth domination. She is portrayed by Mika Katsumura (勝村 美香, Katsumura Mika).

Former members

- Anne (アンヌ, Annu): One of the members of the original Ultra Guard during her active years. Anne had since retired and settled down with a family, having a daughter and a son named Dan. Although retired, she still retains her training from her past as an Ultra Guard member. Yuriko Hishimi (ひし美 ゆり子, Hishimi Yuriko) reprised her role as Anne Yuri.
- Kiriyama (キリヤマ): The captain of the first Ultra Guard. He was killed by the Public Security Bureau under Kaji's orders to silence those with information of the Omega Files, as Kiriyama had a direct confrontation with the Nonmalt during his active years. Kiriyama's actor, Shōji Nakayama (中山 昭二, Nakayama Shōji), was meant to reprise his role, but his untimely death in December 1998 forced the series to abandon Kiriyama's role in the story.
  - In Ultraseven: Episode 0 novel, Kiriyama's involvement in Nonmalt's underwater city was to take the blame for their deaths had their claims were to be true, hoping to spare mankind from this guilt if TDF took matters into their own hands. During the Omega Files incident, Kiriyama had retired and aged into a senile old man who spent the rest of his days at TDF's retirement home. He was visited by Shiragane to provide his testimony over the Nonmalt's case in the past.

=== Terrestrial Defense Force ===
TDF members

- Takenaka (タケナカ): Originally an advisor to the Ultra Guard during their active years, Takenaka had since promoted to the rank of director in TDF's Far East Base. When the knowledge of Kaji protecting the Omega File's secret, including the assassination of Kiriyama, Takenaka gave Shiragane the approval of broadcasting the file's content to the outer space and proposed for TDF to enter an era of peace, hence putting a stop to Kaji's Friendship Plan. Kenji Sahara (佐原 健二, Sahara Kenji) reprised his role as Takenaka.
  - In the novel adaptation, Takenaka was removed of his position in the TDF Far East Base by Inagaki during Alien Garut's invasion plan. Takenaka would later join Furuhashi in spearheading the reconstruction of TDF Far East Base once Alien Garut's threat was taken care of by Seven.
- Inagaki (イナガキ): One of the many TDF staff officers in The Final Chapters Hexalogy, who usually discussed their decisions with director Takenaka. Inagaki was one of Kaji's cronies in preserving the Omega Files, but was forced to comply with Takenaka's decision to broadcast the files to the entire universe. In the Evolution Pentalogy, Inagaki was forced to conspire with Alien Garut after being mislead by the latter's fake copy of Akashic Records, hoping to ensure mankind's survival in Earth's future under the alien's rule. This led to him to allowing aliens to kill and replace most of the TDF personnels, sending Yuki to spy in the Ultra Guard and eventually disbanding the team as a whole. Realizing too late of the alien's deception, Inagaki tried to warn Yuki and direct his reasoning to the Omega File, but was killed by Garut to ensure his plans remained a secret. He is portrayed by Masahiro Noguchi (野口 雅弘, Noguchi Masahiro).
  - In the novel adaptation of Heisei Ultraseven, Inagaki was the first of the staff officers to give the Ultra Guard his consent in broadcasting the Omega Files instead of opposing them. When Alien Garut commenced his operation on Earth, Inagaki was deceived by Suwa instead, hence he was spared from death unlike his live action version.
- Mitsugu Ijuuin (伊集院貢, Ijuuin Mitsugu; 6): The leader of TDF's Public Security Bureau who conspired with Kaji to silence those with the knowledge of Omega Files. When Shiragane was investigating Kiriyama's residence, Ijuuin's men had already cleaned up trails of the former captain's existence and he opted for self-immolation to avoid further questioning. He is portrayed by Kazumasa Seki (瀬木 一将, Seki Kazumasa).
- Miku (ミク): An elite officer in TDF and Kaji's lover, appeared exclusively in the Ultraseven: Episode 0 novel. Her death in the past during an alien attack on her transport aircraft transformed Kaji into the war hawk he is later on. Kaji kept their engagement rings as a memento for her. When Kaji breaks into tears after failing to prevent Seven from accessing the Omega Files, Miku's spirit appeared and asked him to abandon his irrational behavior.
- Saijō (サイジョウ): A staff officer who appeared exclusively in the Evolution Pentalogy. He rallied the TDF survivors in joining the Ultra Guard during their fight against Alien Garut's invasion on Earth. He is portrayed by Masaki Nishimori (西守 正樹, Nishimori Masaki).
- Suwa (諏訪): The captain of TDF's special forces and Yuki's direct superior. When Alien Garut presented TDF with his fabricated copy of the Akashic Records, Suwa led his men to the Urosu Shrine to validate the alien's claim. His team members were killed while Suwa and Yuki, the only survivors of the team, transformed into neo neuron humans by the will of the Akashic Records. Although he aimed to obey the record's will, Suwa was manipulated by Garut into opposing the Ultra Guard by unlesshing Neo Pandon. When Kazamori, Yuki and the Plant Life Form visited the Urosu Shrine, Suwa was killed by Garut, with his remains awakening Yuki's potential to provide Kazamori an entrance to the Akashic Records. He is portrayed by Kyoji Kamui (神威 杏次, Kamui Kyoji), who previously portrayed one of the Alien Metron siblings in Ultraseven - Planet of the Earthlings.
- Nanbara (ナンバラ): A staff officer who appeared in the novel adaptation of Heisei Ultraseven, joining forces with Saijo and the Ultra Guard after TDF's destruction.

== Antagonists ==
=== Kaji ===
Kaji (カジ) is a hot-blooded member of Ultra Guard under Furuhashi's leadership in the 1994 TV Special. However, after the events of an alien invasion, Kaji's relationship with Furuhashi became strained at best due to the presumed deaths of his teammates. In the novel adaptation, he was revealed to have lost his girlfriend, Miku, in that alien invasion after her transport airplane was targeted, leaving Kaji with their engagement rings as her memento.

Kaji became the major antagonist of The Final Chapters Hexalogy, having been promoted to TDF's staff officer at the same time as Furuhashi. He proposed the Friendship Plan (フレンドシップ計画, Furendoshippu Keikaku) to the TDF, which involved the interstellar bombing planets with intelligent life forms that were percecive as potential threats to Earth's safety. Although this plan was met with oppositions by Furuhashi, the Ultra Guard and a few of TDF members, Kaji nonetheless took advantage of the chaos resulted by Alien Valkyrie to discredit the Ultra Guard and placed himself in charge of their operations when Furuhashi was killed by the alien. With Valkyrie's existence proven, Kaji choose the alien's planet as the first victim of the Friendship Plan, followed by several other planets after that. With him running Furuhashi's former position to observe the Ultra Guard's activities, Kaji more or less became a hindrance to their operations and often butted heads with the team members. Eventually in I am an Earthling, Kaji was revealed to have conspired with TDF's Public Security Bureau in silencing those who knew about the Omega Files, such as former Ultra Guard captain Kiriyama and came close to executing Seven while he was in disguise as Kazamori. When the Ultra Guard announced their rebellion against Kaji, Seven went through Kaji's defenses, causing him to throw his guns once Takenaka approved the interstellar broadcast of the Omega Files. This caused Kaji to break down in tears as he believe mankind's claim to Earth would be threatened. With his Friendship Plan abolished, Kaji's final fate was remained ambiguous.

Kaji is portrayed by Shigeki Kagemaru (影丸 茂樹, Kagemaru Shigeki). The character was absent in Ultraseven 30th Anniversary Trilogy due to Shigeki Kagemaru being preoccupied with his role as Tetsuo Shinjoh in Ultraman Tiga.

=== Nonmalt ===
The Earth Hominid Nonmalt (地球原人 ノンマルト, Chikyū Genjin Nonmaruto) is the final villain of the Ultraseven 1999 The Final Hexalogy episode 6, I am an Earthling.

The Nonmalts were originally the dominant species of planet Earth some 10,000s of years prior, until mankind's ancestors invaded the planet and overthrow Nonmalt as the new dominant species. After the Nonmalt race were eradicated by the Ultra Guard, led by captain Kiriyama, in episode 42 of Ultraseven, a lone Nonmalt survived the genocide and mislead Seven into exposing his true identity to the TDF before she exposed herself as a Nonmalt survivor who wanted to eradicate mankind to avenge her race. Although she validated her claims through the Omega Files, Nonmalt was still adamant in fulfilling her revenge by sending Zabangi to stop the TDF from broadcasting the files to outer space, as this admittance would've effectively absolved mankind of their ancestor's crimes. After Zabangi was killed, Nonmalt warned Seven that he had turned himself into a pariah before vanishing.

The novel adaptation of Heisei Ultraseven had Nonmalt assuming the form of a young Anne by reading Dan Moroboshi's memory of his departure from Earth. However, Anne's memory overloaded her mind, driving her somewhat insane and leading her to command Zabangi to destroy everything 'beautiful', eventually getting herself burned alive by her own monster.

- Guardian Deity Monster Zabangi (守護神獣 ザバンギ, Shugo Shinjū Zabangi): The guardian deity worshipped by the Nonmalts in the ancient past. Zabangi was sent to foil the TDF's attempt at broadcasting the Omega Files by destroying their facility. The monster managed to defeat both Miclas and Windom while they were guarding it, but was swiftly killed by Seven when the Ultra slit its neck with his Eye Slugger. Zabangi's main ability was to spit Superheated Fireballs (高熱火球, Kōnetsu Kakyū) from its mouth.

The Nonmalt's human form is portrayed by Noriko Watanabe (渡辺 典子, Watanabe Noriko).

=== Alien Garut ===
Metal Alien Alien Garut (メタル宇宙人 ガルト星人, Metaru Uchūjin Garuto Seijin) is the main antagonist of Ultraseven 35th Anniversary Evolution Pentalogy.

An alien who proclaimed himself to be a Fixed Point Observer, Alien Garut first arrived on Earth a year after Seven's imprisonment in the Horsehead Nebula, plotting to invade the planet by fabricating the Akashic Records to his favor. Using this, he managed to sway TDF staff officer Inagaki and Suwa to his side and slowly replaced TDF officers in the Far East Base with his alien cohorts while taking advantage of the peace on Earth through TDF's peace treaty with alien civilizations. He also assumed the human form of TDF researcher Tashiro (タシロ) to keep an eye on Seven's imprisonment in Horsehead Nebula.

Four years later in the present day, Garut put his plan to procure the Plant Life Forms to his side in motion by having the radical faction of Alien Pegassa launching their attack to absorb cities through their weaponized Dark Zone. Then after Alien Godola failed to prevent the Ultra Guard from blowing up TDF's Far East Base, Garut manipulated a trio of psychic powered children while his alien cohorts brainwashed the human society into a false peace and for Suwa to unleash the Neo Pandon. When the TDF tried to hunt down the Plant Life Form, Garut attempted to present himself as Kazamori's ally, but the young man saw through his trick. With Kazamori/Seven foiling Garut's deceptions, the alien was forced to summon Gaimos and enlarge to a giant stature to face Ultraseven. He was blown into pieces by Seven's Wide Shot while Kazamori undid his lies of the Akashic Records by presenting his teammates with the real copy of it.

- Mystic Evil Rare Monster Gaimos (妖邪剛獣 ガイモス, Yōja Gōjū Gaimosu): A monster under Alien Garut's command, it has a pair of shoulder cannons that can fire Explosive Fireballs (爆裂火球, Bakuretsu Kakyū). It was deployed to destroy the Urosu Shrine and bury the entry point to the Akashic Records to maintain his fabrication of the real document. After damaging the Ultra Hawk 1, Gaimos faced of against Ultraseven and was joined by its master in the fight. As the monster was about to kill Seven, the Ultra rose and stabbed its gut through the wound he created, causing Gaimos to fall after succumbing to the attack.

Alien Garut is voiced by Tomokazu Seki (関 智一, Seki Tomokazu), who also portrayed his human form Tashiro.

== Other characters ==
1994

- Professor Kusuhara (クスハラ博士, Kusuhara-hakase; 1): Anne's brother-in-law and the leading figure of the Hyper Solar System (ハイパーソーラーシステム, Haipā Sōrā Shisutemu) project. The Pitts broke into his office but failed to kill him when the Ultra Guard arrived. Kusuhara would later ordered his men to use the Hyper Solar System in draining Eleking's energy, allowing Seven to deliver his counterattack and kill the monster. He is portrayed by Shinichi Ogishima (荻島 真一, Ogishima Shin'ichi).
- Dan (ダン; 1): Anne's youngest son, who was named after Seven's human form. He aspired to become a member of the Ultra Guard and had once kidnapped by the Alien Pitt sisters due to his constant meddling in their plans. He was rescued by Ultraseven after the death of Eleking. He is portrayed by Umi Aoki (青木 海, Aoki Umi).
- Toshiko (トシコ; 2): Anne's eldest daughter and Dan's older sister. She is portrayed by Haruka Sawaguchi (沢口 遥, Sawaguchi Haruka).
- Professor Tonezaki (トネザキ教授, Tonezaki-kyōju): A professor from the Kitagawa City's university who studied ancient archaeology. He was tricked by the Alien Metron siblings into assisting with their plans and was held hostage until the Ultra Guard and Dan Moroboshi freed him from Ecopolis. He is portrayed by Hiroshi Tsuburaya (円谷 浩, Tsuburya Hiroshi).

1998

- Kyoko Murata (村田 恭子, Murata Kyōko): A single mother who worked at a local hospital. She raised her daughter, Rei, by her own after her husband walked away from their lives and provided shelter to the amnesiac Dan Moroboshi. When Alien Variel announced his attack, Kyoko reluctantly returned Dan's Ultra Eye and Capsule Monsters to him before they parted ways. She is portrayed by Yoshie Ōtsuka (大塚 良重, Ōtsuka Yoshie).
- Rei Murata (村田 麗, Murata Rei): Kyoko's daughter, who took a part time job at an archaeological site alongside the amnesiac Dan. She is portrayed by Kaori Shimizu (清水 香里, Shimizu Kaori).
- Natsumi (ナツミ, Natsumi): A bartender who agreed to Alien Guts' offer in transforming the human race into sulfur humans, remaining pessimistic that Earth has forsaken mankind. She was killed during the TDF's raid in Alien Guts' lab. She is portrayed by Akiko Sugawara (菅原晶子, Sugawara Akiko).

1999

- Shinichi Imanari (イマナリ・シンイチ, Imanari Shin'ichi; 1): A journalist who became Alien Valkyrie's host to discredit the Ultra Guard through mass-media. The alien was expelled by Dan Moroboshi, forcing him to move on to captain Shiragane. He is portrayed by Shinobu Kameyama (亀山 忍, Kameyama Shinobu), who previously portrayed Kihachi Gondou in Ultraman Dyna.
- Ichirō Hayakawa (ハヤカワ・イチロウ, Hayakawa Ichirō; 2): Satomi's late father, who ran a publishing company in Tokyo. He assisted Alien Kyuru in publishing his novel, hoping to attract an Earth scientist who was able to help them fixing Daitekkai. Unfortunately this attracted the Alien Garo instead and Ichirō was assassinated in a fire that took his company along with him. He is portrayed by Shirō Namiki (並樹 史郎, Namiki Shirō).
- Urashima Tarō (浦島太郎; 4): The eponymous character of his own fairy tale. In Tatsunomiya (Shima's hometown), Urashima met the older sister of the Oto-hime twins and promised to reunite with her after bringing a moon flower with him. Unfortunately after he became time displaced and aged into an old man per the story, Urashima lost his memory and was regarded as an insane elder by the Tatsunomiya. Sumino, the turtle which Urashima rescued in the past, helped the elderly man in navigating his way to the younger Oto-hime twin, but Urashima was forced to witness his lover becoming a monster for breaking their promise. Nevertheless, he presented her the moon flower, affirming that he had not forgotten what they promised a long time ago and disappeared alongside the monster. He is portrayed by Lee Jong-ho (李ぢょんほ, Ri Jōnho) as a young man and Kōjirō Kusanagi (草薙幸二郎, Kusanagi Kōjirō) as his older self.
- Sumino (角野; 4): The turtle which Urashima Tarō rescued in the past. When Urashima was aged into an old man, Sumino assumed the human form of a taxi driver in an attempt to repay the former's good deeds. Sumino would later return to the sea alongside the younger Oto-hime twin once Dairyukai's anger was quelled by Urashima. He is portrayed by Takashi Itō (伊藤 隆, Itō Takashi).
- Haruka Kanemitsu (カネミツ・ハルカ, Kanemitsu Haruka; 5): A high school student and daughter of Yutaka Kanemitsu. As she detested her father's ruthlessness and shady business practices, Haruka wihed upon the piece of Rahakam Stone to replace her father with a kinder clone. Although things went out as she wished, Haruka started to miss her real father. She is portrayed by Fumina Hara (原 史奈, Hara Fumina).
- Yutaka Kanemitsu (カネミツ・ユタカ, Kanemitsu Yutaka; 5): The president of the New Konan Heavy Industries (新甲南重工, Shin Kōnan Jūkō), a ruthless man who puts his factory into the weapons manufacturing business, breaking deals with his business partners and striking a deal with Kaji to fix the Alien Pedan's King Joe in hopes of mass-producing it for other worldwide TDF branches to use. He was replaced by an identical clone who otherwise serve as a benevolent boss and father to Haruka. The Kanemitsu clone served as a mouthpiece to the Rahakam Stone while the real one was placed in his mother's home. After the destruction of the second King Joe, the real Kanemitsu was treated to a hospital and had since mended his relationship with his family members. He is portrayed by Kenji Kasai (河西 健司, Kasai Kenji).

2002

- Shōko Shiragane (シラガネ・ショウコ, Shiragane Shōko; 2): Shiragane's late wife, she was killed in a vehicular accident on the same day Shiragane was assigned to remove a bomb that was planted in TDF's Far East Base. Alien Godola's mental prison had Shiragane trapped in an endless loop of the day of his wife's death, until he made peace with his past regret, allowing him to break free from the alien's grip. She is portrayed by Michiko Shimazaki (島崎 路子, Shimazaki Michiko).

== Monsters and aliens ==
1994 TV Specials

- Transforming Phantom Alien Pitt (変身怪人 ピット星人, Henshin Kaijin Pitto Seijin; 1): A pair of aliens that succeeded their brethren from episode 3 of Ultraseven. The Pitts aimed to conquer Earth by exploiting the planet's deteriorating environment. Having incapacitated Seven, causing him to crash-landed comatosed on Earth, the Pitts tried to sabotage the Hyper Solar System and hacked into TDF's database to erase past Eleking's data to ensure that their modified Eleking would be unstoppable. When the Ultra Guard veteran Furuhashi was able to memorize Eleking's weaknesses, they were forced to recover their monster and kidnapped Dan, Anne's son when the boy started to meddle with their plans. Dan stopped the aliens from assassinating Seven, allowing the Ultra to reawaken and defeated Eleking with mankind's help. Seeing this, the Pitts tried to torture Dan in order to spite the humans, but Seven managed to jump into their ship to rescue the young boy and destroyed the ship and its occupants with the Wide Shot. The Pitts' human forms are portrayed by Mika (実佳).
- Space Monster Eleking III (宇宙怪獣 エレキング ３代目, Uchū Kaijū Erekingu Sandaime; 1): A modified breed of Eleking, based on the same monster that appeared in episode 3 of Ultraseven. The Pitts modified their Eleking with the ability to spew carbon dioxide and inducing greenhouse effect in addition to its original set of powers. Upon being unleashed to attack the Hyper Solar System, Furuhashi was able to direct Kaji into attacking the monster's antennae, its original weakness, forcing Eleking to retreat and recuperate. It was unleashed again to continue its mission and fought against Seven by making use of the Electric Tail. When the humans used the Hyper Solar System to drain Eleking of its energy, Seven was able to turn the tables by severing Eleking's tail, followed by killing the monster with his Emerium Beam.
- Hallucination Alien Alien Metron (幻覚宇宙人 メトロン星人, Genkaku Uchūjin Metoron Seijin Tarude; 2): A trio of aliens whose brethren had once appeared in episode 8 of Ultraseven. After a lone Metron was killed by Seven, the Ultra pursued the other two, a pair of siblings who attempted to turn Earth uninhabitable by destroying the ozone layer for their own race to populate once mankind and other creatures on Earth were rendered extinct by the sun's unfiltered UV rays. In addition to creating a dinosaur clone as their vanguard, they also tricked Professor Tonezaki into aiding their plans by pretending to be space environmentalists. The Ultra Guard and Seven invaded their underground base Ecopolis (エコポリス, Ekoporisu) and launched their attack to save Tonezaki, leaving one of them to survive and grew large to face Seven. The last Metron was killed by Seven's Ryu Bullet Shot, but his death created a series of explosions which seemingly claimed Seven along with him. The Metron siblings' human forms are portrayed by Kyōji Kamui and Motoko Nagino (梛野 素子, Nagino Motoko) respectively.
- Dinosaur (恐竜, Kyōryū; 2): The Alien Metron siblings' dinosaur monster, created through cloning and modification of the theropoda specimen. After being frozen by the Ultra Guard, the Metrons brought the monster away and unleashed it again to fight against Seven. Unfortunately it was killed by a barrage of explosions resulted from the destruction of anti-ozone missiles hidden in the underground base Ecopolis.

1998 Trilogy

- Brainwashing Alien Alien Variel (洗脳宇宙人 ヴァリエル星人, Sen'nō Uchūjin Varieru Seijin; 1): An alien who served as the first opponent to be faced by Shiragane's team of Ultra Guard. Having crashed landed on Earth in the distant past, Variel resurfaced in the present day and aimed to restore Earth to its original state after seeing it polluted by mankind's activities. By distributing Variel Plants (ヴァリエル植物, Varieru Shokubutsu), he attempted to erase his victim's memories and turn them into extensions of his will. When the Ultra Guard and an amnesiac Dan caught up with his antics, he activated his space ship to return to his planet in hopes of reaching his brethren into a full-scale invasion of Earth. His ship was taken down and faced against the amnesiac Dan, restoring his lost memories before he was killed by Ultraseven's Wide Shot. In his true form, Variel uses a pair of flower petal-like arms to shoot Seed Missiles (シードミサイル, Shīdo Misairu) and Particle Beam (パーティクルビーム, Pātikuru Bīmu) pollens. He is voiced by Mahito Ohba (大場 真人, Ōba Mahito), while his female human form is portrayed by Mashiko Oshima (大島 万記子, Ōshima Mashiko).
- Clone Alien Alien Guts (分身宇宙人 ガッツ星人, Bunshin Uchūjin Gattsu Seijin; 2): An alien whose race first appeared in episode 39 of Ultraseven. Setting up a base in Nagaura City's abandoned factory, Alien Guts planned to turn humans into sulfur-breathing creatures in hopes of preserving their DNA into the future should a mantle plume take place. As Dan managed to catch up with their actions, Alien Guts tried to have him banished from the city by framing him for the death of the local bartender. The alien defeated Seven during his infiltration into the city in Kazamori's form. When TDF stormed the alien's factory, Alien Guts summoned Salphas and try to escape from Earth, but was shot down by the Ultra Hawk 1 piloted by Shiragane. He is voiced by Masaharu Satō (佐藤 正治, Satō Masaharu).
- Sulfur Monster Salphas (硫黄怪獣 サルファス, Io Kaijū Sarufasu; 2): An Earth monster which Alien Guts modified into a sulfur-based organism in the same manner as his sulfur humans. Salphas was sent to deal with Ultraseven and sever him from the sunlight, weakening his energies until Shiragane in the Ultra Hawk cleared the skies. Salphas was killed by an empowered Wide Shot. Due to Alien Guts' modification, Salphas had the ability to exhale Sulfur Bacteria Gas (硫黄細菌ガス, Iōsaikin Gasu) from its mouth and secreting Mantle Steam (マントルスチーム, Mantoru Suchīmu) from the exhaust pipes on its back to sever the Earth from sunlight.
- Sun Monster Bandelas (太陽獣 バンデラス, Taiyō-jū Banderasu; 3): A creature born as an extension to the Bandelas System (バンデラス星系, Banderasu Seikei)'s dying sun's will. In order to ensure that his namesake star system's sun can still support its inhabitants, Bandelas targeted the Miyanishi Village and manipulated its villagers into gold-hunting lunatics to absorb their Minus Energy. When the Ultra Guard and Dan Moroboshi caught up with his operation, Bandelas allowed the TDF to negotiate in order to permit his presence on Earth. When TDF decided to exterminate him, Dan returned from his trip to Bandelas System to reveal that its inhabitants had long left for other planets, which caused Bandelas to break down and transform into a monster. Dan transformed into Seven and fought against the creature. After freezing his remains, he brought it to outer space for safe detonation via Wide Shot. As a monster, Bandelas was capable of using sunlight based attacks to his liking, such as the Shining Heat (シャイニングヒート, Shainingu Hīto) and Solar Cannon Beam (ソーラーカノンビーム, Sōrā Kanon Bīmu). He is voiced by Ten Manno (萬野 展, Man'no Ten).

1999 The Final Chapters

- Spirit Parasite Alien Valkyrie (精神寄生体 ヴァルキューレ星人, Seishin Kisei-tai Varukyūre Seijin; 1): An alien from Planet Valkyrie (ヴァルキューレ星, Varukyūre Sei), the tenth planet of the Solar System. Angered over TDF's intrusion on the planet, a lone Alien Valkyrie instigated the destruction of TDF's moon base and pin the blame to Furuhashi. On Earth, he attempted to discredit the Ultra Guard after coming to the conclusion that the Friendship Plan that would threaten his planet. After exiting Shinichi Inamari, Valkyrie possessed Shiragane and instigated a fight between members of the Ultra Guard before they were reduced to Kazamori as his final host, to which Dan/Seven forced him out by firing on the young officer. Failing to possess Dan, Valkyrie assumed his true grotesque form as Seven killed the monster after enduring a series of sneak attacks. Despite Valkyrie's attempt to put the Friendship Plan to a stop, his very presence on Earth becomes the final push for the TDF to execute it by using Planet Valkyrie as the first target. He is voiced by Mahito Ohba. In the novel adaptation, Alien Valkyrie's race is stated to be gaseous is nature, while his physical form is due to the mutation from Earth's atmosphere.
- Naturalized Alien Alien Kyuru (帰化宇宙人 キュルウ星人, Kika Uchūjin Kyurū Seijin; 2): An alien who crash landed on Earth 20 years prior to the story. Assuming the form of Yoshiya Henmi (辺見 芳哉, Henmi Yoshiya), Kyuru befriended Satomi's father, Ichirō, wherein both agreed to publish the alien's novel, The Sky-Flying Iron Colossus (空飛ぶ大鉄塊, Soratobu Daitekkai), in hopes of picking the attention of any scientists who could help him fix Daitekkai and return to his home planet. However, when Alien Garo started to hunt Kyuru by killing Ichirō, the alien was forced to take refuge in Satomi's home island, spending his time with Ichirō's daughter before hiding from the society. In the present day, Kyuru was forced to reveal himself when the Alien Garo targeted Satomi at her island. Kyuru tended to her injuries before he went off to cooperate with Seven in stopping Alien Garo. By pretending to surrender to the Garos and had himself merged with Daitekkai as a power source, Kyuru sacrifice his life by exposing the robot's weakness for Seven to deliver his attack. He is portrayed by Shoichiro Akaboshi (赤星 昇一郎, Akaboshi Shōichirō).
- Iron and Steel Robot Daitekkai (鉄鋼ロボット 大鉄塊(ダイテッカイ), Tekkō Robotto Daitekkai; 2): Alien Kyuru's transportation, a spacecraft which was capable of transforming into a powerful robot that can level cities. The Daitekkai was damaged when Kyuru crash landed on Earth and used his novel to secretly publish Daitekkai's plans in hopes that a human scientist would lend their cooperation, only to attract the malicious Alien Garo. 30 years later in the present day, the Garos had partially fixed Daitekkai in order to defend their planet from being a target of the TDF's Friendship Plan. In order to complete the robot, they hunted down Kyuru all the way to Satomi's home island and used Daitekkai against the Ultra Guard. Kyuru surrendered himself to become the final component in fixing Daitekkai, allowing the spaceship/robot to regain its full power. After Kyuru voluntarily exposed the robot's core, this allowed Seven to punch his way into the robot, destroying it while taking the Garos and Kyuru's lives with it.
- Space Insect Alien Garo (宇宙昆虫 ガロ星人, Uchū Konchū Garo Seijin; 2): A trio of space spider aliens with the ability to possess humans by latching onto the back of their heads. The Garos were originally aliens who sought to invade the Earth through Kyuru's Daitekkai, having killed Satomi's father, Ichirō and hunted for the robot's original owner. The Garos eventually abandoned their invasion plan, but returned to action 2 decades later when TDF's Friendship Plan began to threaten the safety of their home planet. After failing to kidnap Satomi, they were forced to unleash the partially-fixed robot against the Ultra Guard and Ultraseven. Kyuru voluntarily surrendered to the Alien Garos to serve as Daitekkai's final component, but the heroic alien sacrificed himself by exposing the robot's weakness for Seven to strike. Daitekkai's explosion claimed both the Garos and Kyuru's lives while putting an end to the evil alien's invasion scheme.
- Criminal Alien Alien Lemojo (犯罪宇宙人 レモジョ星系人, Hanzai Uchūjin Remojo Seikeijin; 3): A group of seven terrorists from Lemojo System, appearing similar to Earth fungi. Their ship crash landed on Peru after a mutiny happened, leaving only three members to survive. They planned to unleash their bio-weapon Borajo to exterminate mankind on Earth and regrouped in Japan a month later, but their actions were discovered by the TDF and they were killed by the Ultra Guard members. Although capable of assuming human forms, the Lemojo could only maintain their disguise for 12–16 hours.
  - Gale (ゲイル, Geiru): The de facto leader of the three surviving Lemojo, who assumed the form of a professional boxer. Realizing that the Ultra Guard had caught up with their actions, he tried to ambush the team by masquerading as Kazamori, but was forced to retreat when the Seven-Kazamori summoned a Windom to scare Gale and Powan. Two days later, he was killed after the Ultra Guard seized most of the Borajo plants, but Gale was able to secure a single specimen and used his own bio-energy to turn it into a monster. He is portrayed by Kazuoki Takahashi (高橋 和興, Takahashi Kazuoki).
  - Powan (ポワン): The sole female of the Lemojo criminals, she assumed the form of the deceased dentist Saeko Hamuro (葉室 サエコ, Hamuro Saeko) and took advantage of Mizuno's growing feelings for her by planting a bug in his fake tooth. She was mortally injured during the Ultra Guard's raid on the Borajo plants while spending her last breath in Mizuno's arms. She is portrayed by Tomomi Miyauchi (宮内 知美, Miyauchi Tomomi).
  - Mupyo (ムーピョ, Mūpyo): A bumbling member of the group who assumed the form of a salaryman. After being caught stealing in a supermarket, a series of incidents caused him to expose his disguise and threatened his comrades' positions. Mupyo was killed in a failed attempt to ambush the Ultra Guard officers. He is portrayed by Makoto Kakeda (掛田誠, Kakeda Makoto).
- Capsule Monsters (カプセル怪獣, Kapuseru Kaijū): Seven's set of personal monsters which he deployed in the original series should he found himself preoccupied or unable to transform. The capsules have healing chambers which allow the occupants to recuperate from near-death experiences. The only unused monster was Agira, as the novel adaptation explained that it was unavailable at the time.
  - Windom (ウインダム, Uindamu; 3, 6): The first Capsule Monster that Ultraseven utilized way back in the first episode of his titular series. Originally mortally wounded from the fight with Alien Guts in the past, Windom was fixed in the present day for the Seven-Kazamori to use to scare Alien Lemojo Powan and Gale. Windom was summoned again alongside Miclas to protect the TDF radio base from being attacked by Zabangi while interstellar transmission of the Omega Files took place. Windom was heavily injured from being the building's meat shield and its comatose body was salvaged by Seven.
  - Miclas (ミクラス, Mikurasu; 6): The second Capsule Monster, first appearing in episode 3 of Ultraseven. Miclas was summoned alongside Windom to delay Zabangi while transmission of the Omega Files took place. The mortally wounded Miclas was salvaged alongside Windom by Dan prior to his fight with Nonmalt's monster.
- Plant Monster Borajo (植物獣 ボラジョ, Shokubutsu-jū Borajo; 3): Originally plants from Lemojo Systems, the Borajo were modified by Alien Lemojo terrorists to be unleashed on Earth for the genocide of mankind. After the Lemojo ship crash landed on Peru, Borajo plants were shipped off to Japan where it consumed mice in the refinery to gather their strengths. When the Ultra Guard ambushed Gale and Powan, they managed to incinerate all but one of the Borajo plants, the last one which Gale managed to activate at the cost of his own life. The surviving Borajo turned into a monster that Seven faced off against and was killed by Seven's Wide Shot. Borajo is capable of spraying Dissolving Liquids (溶解液, Yōkai-eki) to corrode buildings.
- Oto-hime (乙姫; 4): In Tatsunomiya's variation of Urashima Tarō, Oto-hime is portrayed as a pair of twin sisters. Both Oto-hime are portrayed by Noriko Tanaka (田中 規子, Tanaka Noriko).
  - Space-Time Monster Dairyukai (時空怪獣 大龍海(ダイリュウカイ), Jikū Kaijū Dairyūkai; 4): The older Oto-hime twin became smitten with Urashima Tarō and gave him a clamshell-themed Tamatebako that he swore upon to never open it until he returned to Ryūgū-jō. Unfortunately when Urashima broke the promise and became an elderly version of himself, the older Oto-hime died and her spirit transformed into a vengeful monster. She appeared in Tatsunomiya to kill Urashima for breaking their promise, fighting both Seven and the Ultra Guard along the way. When Urashima presented her the moon flower he promised to deliver as a gift, Dairyukai stopped her attacks and disappeared alongside her former lover. Dairyukai's ability was to exhale Interference Gas (攪乱ガス, Kakuran Gasu) from her mouth.
  - The younger Oto-hime first appeared in Tatsunomiya to create a string of temporal incidents, layering the city with past versions of itself in order to draw Urashima Tarō's attention. Her actions, however, almost doomed the entire village until she summoned Dairyukai to punish Urashima for breaking the pact he made with her sister. With Dairyukai and Urashima disappeared, the younger Oto-hime returned to the sea alongside Sumino.
- Rahakam Stone (ラハカムストーン, Rahakamu Sutōn): A mysterious stone dated back to the era of Mu civilization, it had the ability to manipulate plasma and copying the thoughts of those who prayed to the stone to grant their wishes. One of these visitors, Haruka, used a fraction of the Rahakam to create a kinder copy of her father. As a result of Kaji's paranoia that the stone was an invader who planned to hijack King Joe II into destroying mankind, the Rahakam Stone granted his wish before it was reduced to ashes.
- Space Robot King Joe II (宇宙ロボット キングジョーII, Uchū Robotto Kingu Jō Tsū; 5): The remnants of the original King Joe from episodes 13 and 14 of Ultraseven. It was salvaged by New Konan Heavy Industries and rebuilt in the Ariake Factory in order for the TDF to weaponize it as part of the strengthening their arms. Despite Kaji's intention for mass-produced King Joe for worldwide TDF branches to use, the Kanemitsu clone repurposed the robot for rescue purposes. Kaji's mistake in accidentally wishing to Rahakam Stone caused King Joe to be hacked back into its original murderous directive, escaping the Ariake Factory in a programmed rampaging spree. Seven fought against the robot and made use of the crack where the original King Joe was destroyed in the past, reducing the robot to scraps.

2002 Evolution

- Wandering Alien Alien Pegassa (放浪宇宙人 ペガッサ星人, Hōrō Uchūjin Pegassa Seijin; 1): A race of aliens who debuted in episode 6 of Ultraseven. After the destruction of their Pegassa City (ペガッサシティ, Pegassa Shiti), survivors split into two separate camps, the moderate faction who chose to continue living on Earth, and the radical faction who allied themselves with Alien Garut. The radical faction aimed to seize the planet Earth as their own to exact their revenge on mankind by transforming their Dark Zone (ダーク・ゾーン, Dāku Zōn) pocket dimension to swallow city-wide areas. The moderate faction led by Sayuri spirited the key for her device to cancel the radical Pegassa's plans. With their original plan foiled by the moderate Pegassas and the Ultra Guard, the radical camp continued to serve Garut in defending the TDF Far East Base when the Ultra Guard commenced their attack three weeks later. Alien Pegassa are voiced by Masaharu Satō and Hiroki Tonomura (外村 ひろき, Tonomura Hiroki).
  - Teacher Sayuri (サユリ先生, Sayuri-sensei): The leader of the moderate Pegassa faction. As she lost her son after being forced to abandon him in the Pegassa City's destruction, she took on a human form and established an orphanage to raise unfortunate children, including future Ultra Guard member Yuki Kisaragi. After acquiring the last piece of her device from Kazamori and explaining the young man of his true nature as Seven's splintered half, Sayuri sacrificed her life to prevent the radical Pegassa faction from using their weaponized Dark Zone at the cost of her life. She is portrayed by Hiroko Sakurai (桜井 浩子, Sakurai Hiroko), who previously portrayed Akiko Fuji of Ultraman. Sakurai also made a guest appearance earlier in Ultraseven - Operation: Solar Energy.
- Dragonic Saucer (円盤竜, Enban Ryū; 1-5): An alien creature with similarity to Nurse from episode 11 of Ultraseven. A Fixed Point Observer from another star system, the Dragonic Saucer observe the conflict between the TDF and Alien Garut's faction. When Satomi was killed by a stray bullet, the Dragonic Saucer converted her lifeless body into pure energy for her spirit to reach Seven and free the Ultra from his banishment. He was last seen observing Kazamori/Seven's departure to continue wandering the Earth. He is voiced by Issei Futamata (二又 一成, Futamata Issei).
- Anti-Gravity Alien Alien Godola (反重力宇宙人 ゴドラ星人, Han Jūryoku Uchūjin Godora Seijin; 2): An alien whose brethren had once fought against the Ultra Guard in episode 4 of Ultraseven. Godola was one of the many aliens who conspired with Alien Garut to take over the TDF's Far East Base. When the Ultra Guard stormed their former base to retrieve the Omega Files, Godola trapped them in their respective mental prisons. After Kazamori rescued his former teammates, Shiragane challenged a Godola to a gunfight. The alien was killed as the Omega Files were retrieved and for TDF's Far East Base to be detonated to cripple Garut's alien cronies. He was voiced by Daisuke Gōri (郷里 大輔, Gōri Daisuke).
- Twin-Headed Synthetic Monster Neo Pandon (双頭合成獣 ネオパンドン, Sōtō Gōsei-jū Neo Pandon; 4, 5): Originally the Pandon from episodes 48 and 49 of Ultraseven, it was resurrected into an artificial creature. Obeying the will of the Akashic Records, Neo Pandon was originally ordered to spread the seeds that will grow into Plant Life Forms, but Suwa utilized the Pandon controller belonged to Alien Ghose in manipulating the monster against the Ultra Guard and Ultraseven. Mitsuko, one of the Plant Life Forms, managed to reclaim the Pandon controller from Suwa and forced the monster to stand down, but Shima's poor judgement of her as an evil alien caused him to reactivate Pandon when his own emotions empowered the monster. Seven killed the monster through Ultra Cross Attacker. From its mouth, Neo Pandon can spit Destructive Photospheres (破壊光球, Hakai Kōkyū). In the novel adaptation, Neo Pandon simply rose to distribute the Plant Life Form seeds before it went into an eternal slumber, having finished the task given by the will of the Akashic Records.
- Plant Life Forms (植物生命体, Sokubutsu Seimei-tai; 4, 5): A new species to planet Earth, evolved from plants with the ability to heal, purify pollution and resurrecting dead vegetation. According to the Akashic Records, the Plant Life Forms were intended to create a better future through cooperation with mankind and neo neuron humans, but Alien Garut fabricated the document that made it appear as if the Plant Life Forms were the sole inheritors of Earth's future. This resulted with Alien Garut and his cohorts planning to manipulate the creatures as figureheads to rule the Earth while the TDF planned to eradicate their race. When Neo Pandon distributed the seeds, the Ultra Guard members destroyed all but two of them. The first surviving member was killed by Shima in a fit of his paranoia, while the second one become the sole survivor whose safety was entrusted to the Ultra Guard by Kazamori once Alien Garut's fabrication was exposed. The Plant Life Forms are portrayed by Saori Nara (奈良 沙緒理, Nara Saori).
  - Mitsuko (ミツコ; 4): The first Plant Life Form to grow, she was taken care by an old man who named her after his deceased daughter. Despite Mitsuko's attempt at stopping Neo Pandon's attack, she was killed by a paranoid Shima after falsely assuming her to be an invader. On her dying breath, she requested for Kazamori to protect the seedlings of her race. The younger Mitsuko is portrayed by Mirai Shida (志田 未来, Shida Mirai).
  - (5): The second Plant Life Form was originally a seed which Mizuno spared from dissection, until Kazamori stole and protected her while she grew into an adult. The pair had been on the run from both the TDF and Garut alike while making their way to the Urosu shrine. After Kazamori exposed Garut's deception in fabricating the Akashic Records, he left the Plant Life Form to the Ultra Guard, fully confident that she was no longer considered a threat to mankind.
