= Metron Aviation =

- Company type: Subsidiary
- Industry: Air traffic flow management
- Founded: 1995
- Headquarters: Ashburn, VA
- Key people: Chris Jordan, President
- Products: Harmony, Horizon, POET, Suite for Airlines
- Number of employees: ▼50
- Parent: Stratify Aerospace
- Website: www.metronaviation.com

Metron Aviation, a subsidiary of Stratify Aerospace based in Ashburn, Virginia, operates within the air traffic management and air traffic flow management sectors. The company develops software for traffic flow management, surface operations management, airspace design, and environmental analysis. These tools are designed for air navigation service providers, airlines, airports, and government entities.

== History ==
Founded in 1995, Metron Aviation provides services in air traffic flow management, working with the Federal Aviation Administration to develop a collaborative decision making platform for optimizing system-wide traffic flow.

In July 2011, Airbus acquired Metron Aviation. Following the acquisition, Metron Aviation was reorganized in 2012 to align with the launch of Airbus ProSky, the air traffic management subsidiary of Airbus based in Toulouse, France.

Metron Aviation was acquired by Stratify Aerospace in April 2025.
