= Aerostructure =

Structural component of an aircraft airframe

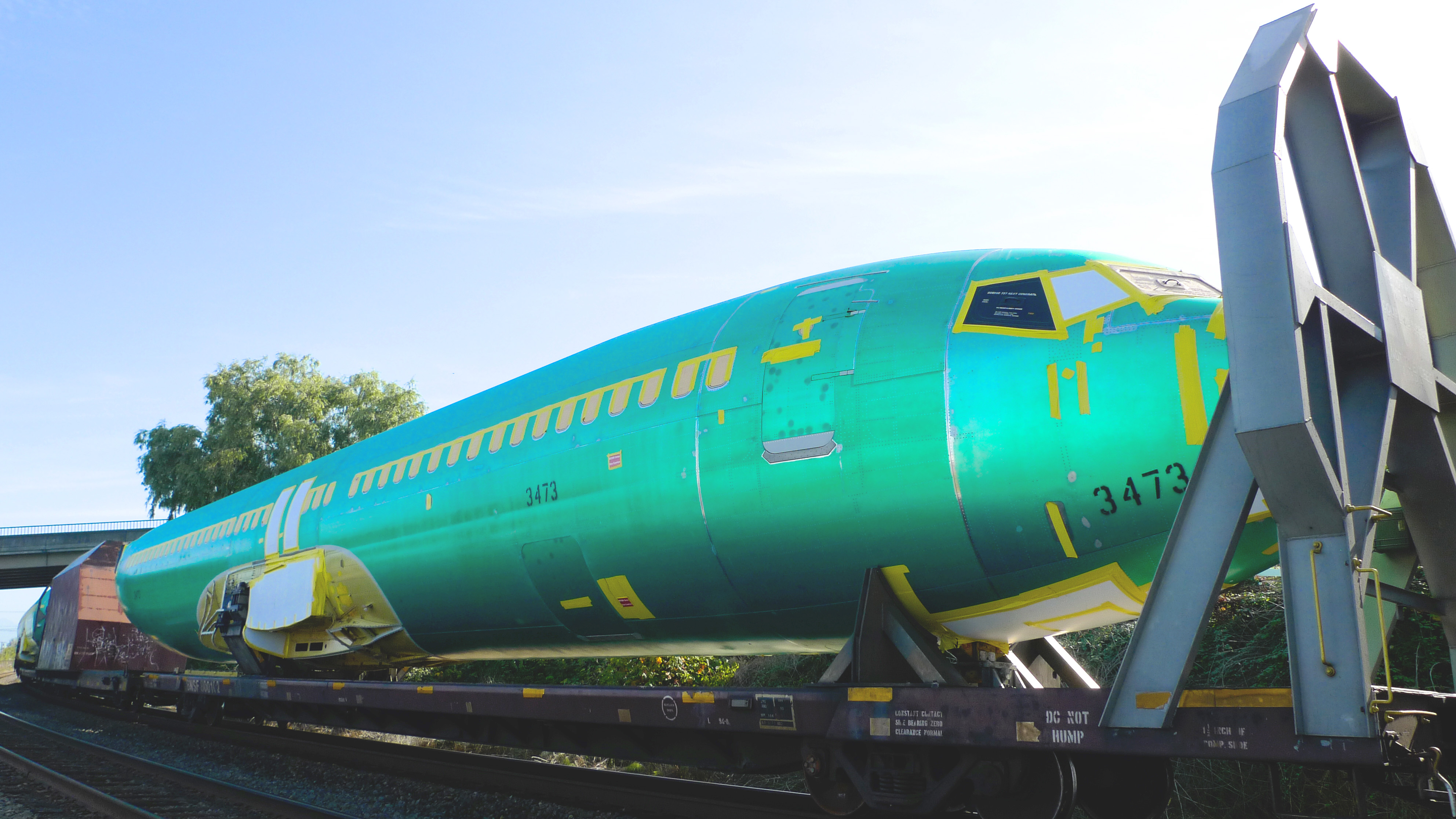
Fuselage aerostructure for the Boeing 737 being transported via rail.

An aerostructure is an individually manufactured section of an aircraft's airframe, such as a fuselage section, a wing, an empennage, a flight control surface, an nacelle or a pylon. Aerostructures are built for fixed-wing aircraft, rotorcraft and unmanned aerial vehicles, civil and military, and are usually produced separately and joined on a final assembly line. Companies that specialize in them are called aerostructures manufacturers or aerostructures suppliers; aircraft manufacturers also build aerostructures themselves.

The terms Airframe and Aerostructure are related but not interchangeable. An aircraft's airframe is its complete mechanical structure, considered as a whole: the fuselage, wings, empennage and landing gear, excluding the propulsion system. An aerostructure is one of the physical pieces into which that airframe is divided for manufacture. The airframe is the product of aircraft design; aerostructures are the units of production and supply, each with its own supplier, tooling, bill of material and delivery schedule.

An aerostructure consists of detailed metallic parts, detailed composite parts and systems. The detail parts are joined into sub-assemblies and major assemblies. When the aircraft systems (wiring, fuel lines, floors, landing gear and the like) are installed before delivery, the result is called an equipped or stuffed structure.

== Components ==
=== Detailed metallic parts ===
Metallic detail parts are the machined, formed and forged pieces of an airframe: spars, ribs, frames, bulkheads, longerons, fittings, stringers, clips and skins. The main materials are aluminium alloys and titanium alloys, with steel for highly loaded fittings. Fuselage shells, formed sheet metal parts and stringers are often made in dedicated detail-part plants and shipped to an assembly site.

Since the 1990s, monolithic machined aluminium parts have replaced many riveted sheet-metal assemblies. A single part cut from thick plate or a forging on a high-speed multi-axis mill takes the place of what was formerly several parts and their fasteners, with less tooling and less assembly labour. Titanium structural parts are usually machined from forgings or billets. Most of the raw material ends up as chips, so the buy-to-fly ratio of titanium parts is high and is a major cost driver; near-net-shape forging is one way to reduce it. Some parts are made via 3D printing as well.

=== Detailed composite parts ===
Composite detail parts are made from fibre-reinforced plastics, most often carbon-fibre-reinforced epoxy: skins, panels, spars, stringers, frames, doors, fairings and whole tail surfaces. A part is laid up on composite tooling from pre-preg tape or fabric, by hand or with automated fiber placement and automated tape laying machines, then cured under heat and pressure in an autoclave. Stiffeners can be co-cured with a skin so that a stiffened panel comes out of the autoclave in one piece. Thermoplastic composites are used for smaller parts such as clips.

Composites make up about 50 per cent of the Boeing 787 by structural weight; its fuselage barrels, wings and tail are carbon fibre. The Airbus A350 airframe is up to 54 per cent composite, with titanium and other metallic alloys making up much of the rest.

=== Systems ===
Systems are the non-structural equipment routed through or mounted on the structure: electrical wiring, fuel, crew-escape and life-support systems, floors, lighting, doors, landing gear and radomes. Some suppliers install and test these systems before the structure ships. Spirit AeroSystems delivers the Boeing 787's Section 41 forward fuselage with the flight-deck floor, wiring, lights, bulkhead, cargo doors, landing gear and radome installed and functionally tested. On the Lockheed Martin F-35 Lightning II, BAE Systems builds the rear fuselage and tails and is also responsible for the fuel, crew-escape and life-support systems.

== Assemblies and stuffed structures ==
The nose of the Airbus A380 under construction prior to being joined with the rest of the vehicle is an example of an aerostructures assembly.

Detail parts are joined into sub-assemblies (a stiffened panel, a spar, a door) and then into major assemblies such as a fuselage section or wing box. Metallic and composite parts are mixed within one assembly: a composite skin may be fastened to titanium frames and aluminium fittings, and the joints must be designed to prevent galvanic corrosion between carbon fibre and aluminium. Parts are joined with solid rivets, Hi-Lok-type pins, lockbolts and blind fasteners, or by adhesive bonding and co-curing. A one-piece composite fuselage barrel eliminates tens of thousands of fasteners compared with a built-up metallic fuselage.

A major assembly that leaves the supplier with its systems installed and tested is described as equipped or, in North American usage, stuffed. This moves work from the aircraft manufacturer's final assembly line to the supplier, so that sections arrive ready to be joined rather than as bare structure. The Boeing 787 programme was organized this way: partners were contracted to deliver large composite sections with structure complete and systems installed, and the programme's delays in 2007–2008 were attributed in part to sections arriving at Everett with structural parts missing and without systems equipment.

Some more modern aircraft are assembled via Determinate Assembly.

== Transport ==
A Boeing Dreamlifter, a modified 747-400 used to fly 787 fuselage sections and wings to final assembly

An Airbus A380 fuselage section on a road convoy in southwest France

Major assemblies are often built far from the final assembly line. Boeing moves the Boeing 787's largest sections by air: it converted 747-400s into the Dreamlifter, with an enlarged upper fuselage giving about 65,000 cubic feet of cargo volume, to carry fuselage sections and wings from Nagoya, Grottaglie, Wichita and Charleston to Everett. Four were built, the last entering service in 2010.

Airbus flies sections between its European plants with the Airbus Beluga, derived from the A300, and since 2020 with the larger BelugaXL, derived from the A330. The BelugaXL carries two A350 wings at once, or the A350's largest fuselage section, serving eleven sites including the wing plant at Broughton, Wales and final assembly in Toulouse; six were built to replace the five original Belugas.

Sections too large to fly go by sea, river and road. The Airbus A380's fuselage sections and wings were too big for the Beluga, so Airbus built a dedicated route, the Itinéraire à Grand Gabarit: ships collected the sections from plants in Germany, Britain, Spain and elsewhere in France and delivered them to the port of Pauillac, barges carried them along the Garonne past Bordeaux to Langon, and oversize road convoys covered the last 150 miles to Toulouse over two nights, parking in guarded lots by day. The last set of A380 sections made the journey in February 2020, ahead of the end of A380 production. The Boeing 737 fuselage travels by rail: it is built by Spirit AeroSystems in Wichita, Kansas and shipped complete on a flatcar to Boeing's Renton, Washington plant. Boeing has moved parts from Kansas by rail since the 1960s; the 10,000th 737 fuselage made the trip in 2017.

== Industry ==
Aircraft manufacturers have alternated between building aerostructures in-house and buying them from Tier 1 suppliers. In 2005 Boeing sold its Wichita, Kansas and Tulsa, Oklahoma structures plants to the investment firm Onex, creating Spirit AeroSystems, which supplies the 737 fuselage and the 787 forward fuselage. Airbus spun off its French and German structures plants in 2009 as Aerolia (later Stelia Aerospace) and Premium AEROTEC.

Both later reversed course. In 2021 Airbus said it would fold its aerostructures operations back into two wholly owned companies, calling aerostructures assembly "a core activity". Airbus Atlantic was formed in France on 1 January 2022 from Stelia Aerospace and the Airbus sites at Nantes and Montoir-de-Bretagne, and Airbus Aerostructures in Germany absorbed the Premium AEROTEC sites, finishing on 1 July 2025. Boeing completed its purchase of Spirit AeroSystems on 8 December 2025, taking back the Boeing-related commercial operations; Airbus took the Spirit plants that build A350 fuselage sections in Kinston, North Carolina and Saint-Nazaire, France, the A220 wings and mid-fuselage in Belfast, and A320 and A350 wing components in Prestwick, Scotland.

Independent suppliers build major assemblies, sub-assemblies and detail parts for several airframers at once, across commercial, business, military and unmanned aircraft.

== Examples by platform ==
=== Boeing 787 Dreamliner ===
A graphic showing how the Aerostructures on the Boeing 787 are broken out and which companies build which parts.

The 787's major structures are built by partners around the world and initially joined at the Boeing Everett WA plant and later at the Charleston SC plant. Spirit AeroSystems in Wichita builds the Section 41 forward fuselage, including the nose and flight deck, and the engine pylons; Kawasaki Heavy Industries builds the fuselage section ahead of the wing; Fuji Heavy Industries builds the centre wing box; Mitsubishi Heavy Industries builds the wings; and Alenia, now Leonardo, builds the horizontal stabiliser at Foggia and the centre fuselage sections at Grottaglie, Italy. The aft fuselage sections were first built by Vought Aircraft Industries in North Charleston, South Carolina. Boeing later bought Vought and started final assembly at the former Vought facilities. The composite fuselage sections are made as one-piece barrels, and Spirit delivers Section 41 with its systems installed and tested.

=== Airbus A350 ===
The A350 XWB fuselage is built from large carbon-fibre panels rather than barrels. The centre fuselage, Section 15, is assembled at Saint-Nazaire, France from panels made by automated fibre placement at Kinston, North Carolina, a plant built by Spirit AeroSystems. The wing skins are tape-laid in one piece; the fuselage panels carry a copper mesh for lightning protection, the lower frames and floor beams are titanium and the seat rails are aluminium-lithium. Other A350 fuselage shells come from Airbus Aerostructures' plant at Stade, Germany. Kinston and Saint-Nazaire have been Airbus-owned since December 2025.

=== Lockheed Martin F-35 Lightning II ===
The F-35 airframe is built as four major subassemblies by three companies. Lockheed Martin makes the forward fuselage and wings and performs final assembly in Fort Worth, Texas; Northrop Grumman designed and builds the centre fuselage for all three variants on its integrated assembly line in Palmdale, California; and BAE Systems builds the rear fuselage and the vertical and horizontal tails at Samlesbury, England. By 2015 Northrop Grumman had delivered more than 200 centre fuselages and BAE Systems its 200th rear fuselage. Aircraft for Japan are assembled from the same major sections by Mitsubishi Heavy Industries in Nagoya.

=== Northrop Grumman B-21 Raider ===
In March 2016 the United States Air Force named seven major suppliers on the Northrop Grumman B-21 Raider: Pratt & Whitney for the engines, and BAE Systems, GKN Aerospace, Janicki Industries, Orbital ATK, Rockwell Collins and Spirit AeroSystems. The individual work packages have not been disclosed.

=== General Atomics MQ-9B SkyGuardian ===
GKN Aerospace builds the composite V-tails for the General Atomics MQ-9B SkyGuardian and Protector at Cowes on the Isle of Wight under a long-term agreement with General Atomics Aeronautical Systems.

== Notable manufacturers ==
- Aero Vodochody (Czech Republic) – wing leading edges for the Airbus A220 and fuselage work for the Embraer C-390
- Airbus Aerostructures (Germany) – formed from Premium AEROTEC and Airbus's German structures plants
- Airbus Atlantic (France) – formed from Stelia Aerospace and Airbus's Nantes and Montoir-de-Bretagne sites
- Albany International – Albany Engineered Composites, including the former Exelis/Harris composite aerostructures business in Salt Lake City
- BAE Systems – F-35 rear fuselage and tails
- Collins Aerospace (RTX) – nacelles, pylons, thrust reversers and flight control surfaces, including the former Goodrich Aerostructures business in Chula Vista, California
- Ducommun – contoured aluminium, titanium and Inconel aerostructure components, bonded composite structures, fuselage panels and control surfaces
- GKN Aerospace – wings, fuselages, empennages, nacelles and pylons
- Howmet Aerospace – engineered structures, titanium mill products and fastening systems
- Indonesian Aerospace (PT Dirgantara Indonesia) – A380 fixed leading edges, A320/A321 leading-edge and pylon components, and H225 helicopter fuselages and tailbooms
- Janicki Industries
- Kawasaki Heavy Industries
- Latécoère
- Leonardo – Aerostructures Division, formerly Alenia Aermacchi
- Mitsubishi Heavy Industries
- Northrop Grumman
- Qarbon Aerospace – the former Triumph composite aerostructures plants in Milledgeville, Georgia; Red Oak, Texas; and Rayong, Thailand
- Short Brothers (Belfast) – a Boeing subsidiary since 2025
- Spirit AeroSystems – a Boeing subsidiary since 2025
- Subaru Corporation (formerly Fuji Heavy Industries)
- Triumph Group – taken private by Warburg Pincus and Berkshire Partners in 2025

Former names and businesses since merged:

- Exelis – composite aerostructures in Salt Lake City; acquired by Harris Corporation in 2015 and sold to Albany International in 2016
- Goodrich Aerostructures – nacelles, pylons and thrust reversers, Chula Vista; acquired with Goodrich by United Technologies in July 2012 and now part of Collins Aerospace
- Messier-Bugatti-Dowty – landing gear and braking systems; renamed Safran Landing Systems in 2016
- Premium AEROTEC – Airbus's German structures subsidiary, created in 2009 and merged into Airbus Aerostructures by 2025
- Stelia Aerospace – Airbus's French structures subsidiary, merged into Airbus Atlantic in 2022
- Vought Aircraft Industries – acquired by Triumph Group in June 2010

== See also ==
- Airframe
- Aircraft design process
- Composite material
- Monocoque
- Semi-monocoque
