= Ducommun (disambiguation) =

Ducommun is an aerospace and defense company based in California.

Ducommun may also refer to:

- Élie Ducommun (1833–1906), Swiss peace activist
- Rick Ducommun (1952–2015), Canadian actor
- Samuel Ducommun (1914-1987), Swiss composer
