= Ingersoll Machine Tools =

Machinery producer in Rockford, Illinois

Ingersoll Machine Tools Inc.
- Type: Private company
- Founded: 1891
- Headquarters: Rockford, Illinois
- Key people: Jeffrey Ahrstrom, President & CEO
- Products: Machine tools, Milling machines, Aerospace manufacturing, Advanced fiber placement machines
- Revenue: $51.9 million USD (2019)
- Number of employees: 180 (2019)
- Divisions: Aerospace, Manufacturing, Industrial Technologies
- Website: www.ingersoll.com

Ingersoll Machine Tools is a manufacturer located in Rockford, Illinois that produces large scale machine tools for use in metal cutting, 3D Printing, and automated fiber placement.

== History ==
The company was founded in 1891 by Winthrop Ingersoll when he moved W.R. Eynon & Co. from Cleveland, Ohio to Rockford. Originally, Ingersoll Machine Tools focused almost entirely on milling machinery and processes for metal removal. It acquired contracts from General Electric and, by 1917, was closely involved with wartime production and had a workforce of 600.

Ingersoll went on to produce customized machines for industries such as airplane and auto manufacturing. In the period from the 1960s to the 1980s, the company employed around 2,000 people at its plant, also developing CNC technologies to introduce automation into its manufacturing processes.

== Bankruptcy ==
In 2003, Ingersoll International went bankrupt. The company was purchased by the Italian Camozzi Group. Since its purchase by Camozzi, the company has attempted to redefine its place in the market, continuing with milling machines but also expanding into other areas.

== Present activities ==
Ingersoll Machine Tools is a supplier of machine tools, including large five-axis milling machines, large 3D printers, and automated fiber placement (AFP) for the aerospace industry. It has made the wing molds for Mitsubishi, supplier of the wings on the Boeing 787. In 2010, it received Best Supplier Award from Alenia Aeronautica.

Ingersoll's AFP machines are also installed at UTC Aerospace Systems' (formerly Goodrich Corporation) facilities in Riverside, California. At this facility, the machines are used to layup the engine nacelles for the Boeing 787 and Airbus A350.

Ingersoll has also continued working in the metal cutting industry, with much of its contract production being for the Defense, Aerospace, and wind industry. It has also sold machinery to NASA.

In addition to building machine tools, Ingersoll has built and installed large telescopes for Astronomy research. Most recently, they were selected to build the mount for the Giant Magellan Telescope, which will be installed in Chile.

== Recognition ==
In 2019, the Guinness Book of Worlds Records certified that Ingersoll has produced the world's largest 3D printer. The product, named MasterPrint, was installed at the University of Maine.

Ingersoll Machine Tools was awarded the 2020 Manufacturer of the Year by the Rockford, Illinois Chamber of Commerce.

== See also ==
- Matsuura Machinery
