= Determinate assembly =

Method of assembling aircraft structures

Determinate assembly, also written determinant assembly, is a method of assembly, used for airframe structures, in which the parts locate on one another through features made into them, such as precisely drilled holes, instead of being positioned by an assembly jig. The final form of a determinate assembly is set by the form of its component parts, an approach also described as part-to-part rather than part-to-tool indexing.

== Background ==
Airframe structures have traditionally been built in jigs. A jig holds flexible parts in their final shape while the gaps between them are measured and filled with shims and fastener holes are drilled through the stacked parts; the assembly is then broken apart so that the holes can be deburred, the parts cleaned and sealant applied before final assembly. The jigs are costly, inflexible and have long lead times, and on Boeing's 747 line they had to be overhauled every few aircraft.

== Method ==
In determinate assembly the locating features, which Boeing calls coordination holes and coordination surfaces, are machined into the parts by numerically controlled machines working from the digital design data. The features set the position of the parts relative to one another independently of any tooling.

Researchers at the University of Bath and Airbus wrote in 2011 that it had not been possible to make most aerospace structures to interchangeability tolerances, because interface tolerances are demanding and the components large and flexible, and that the interfaces of composite parts are especially imprecise. They described measurement-assisted determinate assembly, in which the large components are measured and smaller bridging components are machined to fit them, so that the assembly is determinate although its parts are not interchangeable. A 2014 study on a European laminar-flow wing demonstrator achieved determinate assembly of leading-edge brackets to ribs by setting the size and position tolerances of the holes, which removed drilling, deburring and reassembly at that joint.

== Use ==
In 1992 Boeing engineers described a cell for Boeing 757 fuselage panels in which a CNC machine drilled coordination holes in the skin and detail parts from the CATIA design data. Boeing and Northrop Grumman, which built most of the 747 fuselage, applied the method to the 747. Under a program proposed in 1994, called accurate fuselage assembly, the aircraft's 1960s drawings were digitized in CATIA and the data used to make more accurate panels. Boeing's fuselage assembly improvement team, whose process was developed in 1995, replaced the older assembly tooling at Everett with precision holes every 50 cm that located the panels on one another, with lasers used to confirm their position. Automated positioning and alignment systems were installed in the 747 fuselage assembly areas to position the panels. The first 747 whose whole fuselage was built this way, a 747-400 for Japan Airlines, was assembled in 1999. Workers had often spent days adjusting gaps and adding shims; initial analysis showed panel mismatch improving by a factor of about four.

In full-size determinant assembly (FSDA), the term used by Boeing and Lockheed Martin, full-size holes are drilled by CNC machines when the parts are fabricated, and assembly consists of aligning the holes and installing fasteners. Boeing reported in 2022 that FSDA on the nose barrel and wing of the F-15, which have about 13,000 and 24,000 holes, cut assembly tooling by 97 and 90 percent and produced a design that needed no shims. Aviation Week attributed an 80 percent reduction in assembly time on the Boeing T-7A Red Hawk to the technique. FSDA had been used on metal substructure for years; in 2021 Assembly magazine reported a Lockheed Martin prototype that also used it on composite skins, which are otherwise set in place with liquid shim, drilled and then removed again.

== See also ==
- Jig (tool)
- Interchangeable parts
- Design for assembly
- Aerostructure
- Composite tooling
