= Stelia Aerospace =

French aerospace company

- Formerly: Aerolia / Sogerma
- Type: Société par actions simplifiée
- Industry: Aeronautics
- Founded: 1 January 2015
- Headquarters: Toulouse, France
- Area served: Worldwide
- Key people: Cédric Gautier, CEO
- Services: Aerostructures, Airline seats
- Revenue: (€2.2 Billion (2017))
- Number of employees: 7,000 (as at 2019)
- Parent: Airbus
- Website: www.stelia-aerospace.com

Stelia Aerospace (stylized STELIA Aerospace) is an aerospace company headquartered in Toulouse, France. It specializes in the design and manufacture of aerostructures, pilot seats and premium class passenger seats, mainly for the commercial aviation sector.

Stelia Aerospace was created on 1 January 2015 by the merger of two Airbus business units: Aerolia and SOGERMA. The company is a wholly owned subsidiary of Airbus.

== History ==
Stelia Aerospace traces its origins to the merger of two companies, SOGERMA and Aerolia. SOGERMA (Société girondine d’entretien et de réparation de matériel aéronautique) was a French company founded in 1924 amid the early days of aviation.

Prior to its restructuring in 2006, the company largely focused on maintenance, repair and overhaul (MRO), but subsequently directed its resources to its specialist aerostructures and seating activities.

Aerolia SA was founded on 1 January 2009 as a spin-off of Airbus France's aerostructures activities. This involved the Méaulte and Saint-Nazaire industrial plants, along with a design office in Toulouse.

In 2007, EADS' management decided to respond to the weakening US dollar and large investments required for the Airbus A380 and A350 XWB programs by restructuring in order to streamline, divest several non-core activities, and cut costs. Aerospace periodical Flight International compared the move to Boeing's then-recent spin-off of Spirit AeroSystems.

On 1 January 2015, Stelia Aerospace was created via the merger of Aerolia and Sogerma. At the time, Stelia Aerospace employed roughly 6,100 staff across 11 different locations, and the two merged businesses were considered "complementary". Contracts previously undertaken by the two firms carried over to the new entity, including those for fitting-out work on Airbus airliners.

In March 2017, Stelia Aerospace inaugurated a new aeronautics factory in Méaulte, Northern France; this facility, which handles production of the forward fuselages of Airbus airliners and central fuselage of Bombardier Aerospace’s Global 7500 series of business jets, had required a €70 million investment. In February 2018, Stelia Aerospace demonstrated a metallic fuselage panel manufactured using 3D printing techniques. The same year, the firm acquired a majority share of Toulouse-based digital modelling specialist Portalliance Engineering.

In October 2019, Stelia Aerospace announced plans to build a new assembly plant in Portugal at a cost of €40 million. In February 2020, the company started a three-year partnership with Bombardier for the AILE (Aile Intelligente et Légère pour l’Environnement, or Intelligent and Light Wing for Environment) research programme.

Starting on 1 January 2022, Stelia Aerospace sites worldwide were grouped with other Airbus sites in Nantes and Montoir-de-Bretagne under the newly formed Airbus subsidiary Airbus Atlantic.

== Business activities ==
Stelia Aerospace has three main business segments:

- Aerostructures
- Premium class airline seats (First, Business, Premium Economy)
- Pilot seats

Stelia Aerospace also manufactures aircraft interiors.

=== Aerostructures ===
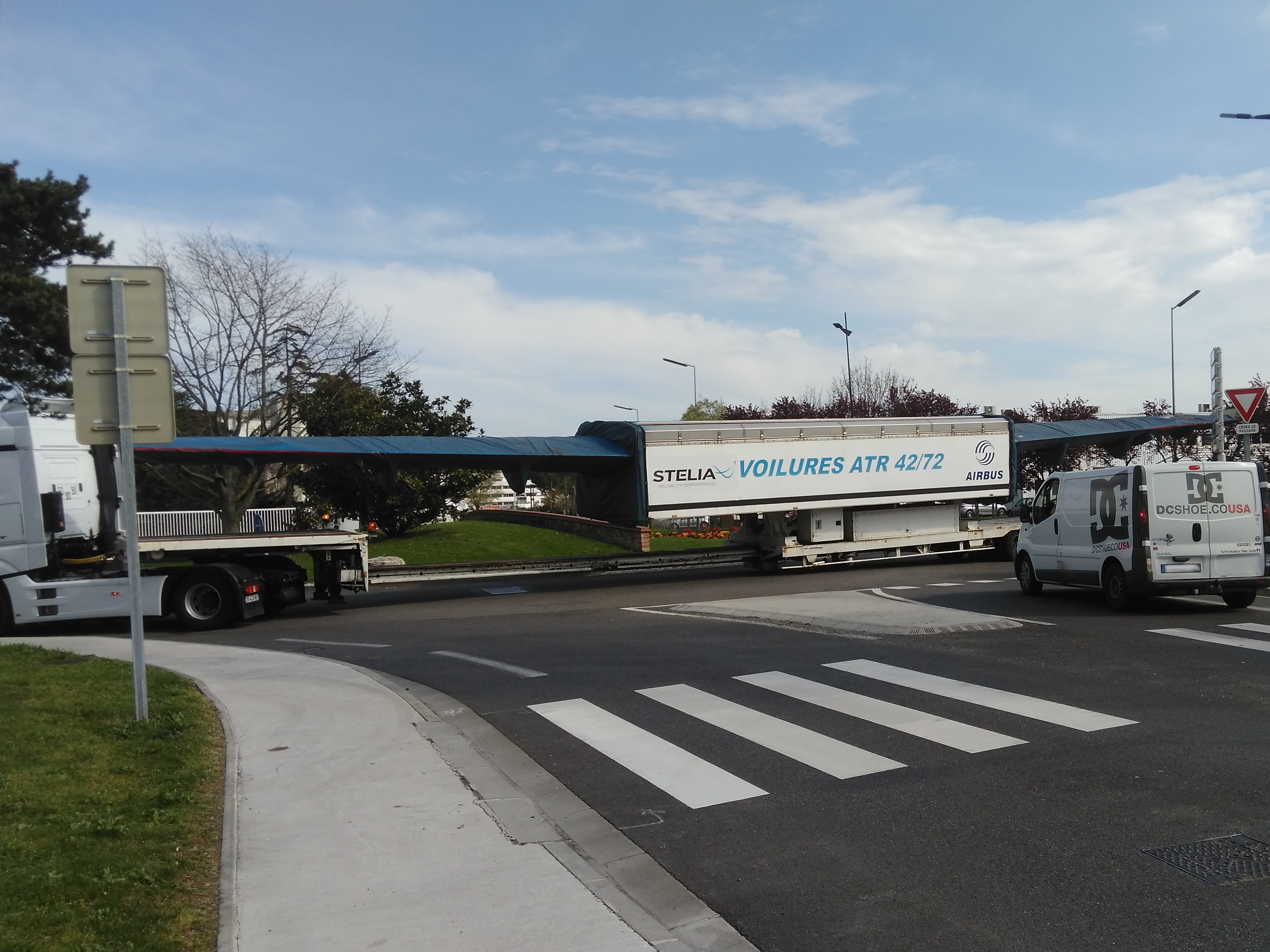
Wings of an ATR being delivered to the final assembly line in Toulouse.

Stelia Aerospace designs and manufactures fully equipped aircraft fuselage sections from the nose to the rear, wings and special work packages such as the main landing gear bay, A400M ramp door, and helicopter tail boom.

A major portion of the company's business is the design and manufacturing of aerostructures, including complex detailed parts comprising both composite and metallic materials. Stelia Aerospace claims that it is one of a small number of companies able to provide a fully equipped section (metallic and/or composite fuselage section, with all the tubes and wiring systems integrated), developing the "plug and fly" concept.

Aircraft components manufactured by Stelia Aerospace include:

- Wings of the ATR family, which are fully equipped and tested up to the final test benches.
- Central section of the Bombardier large business jet Global 7000/8000.
- Various sections of the Airbus A220, such as the cockpit and aft fuselage.
- Elements of the Airbus BelugaXL, including the nose section, cargo door, and upper fuselage with pre-integrated systems (electrical, hydraulic, air conditioning, oxygen, etc.)

== Locations ==
Stelia Aerospace has 11 industrial facilities worldwide, along with supporting offices.

Location	Country / Region	Facility type	Notes
Toulouse	France	Industrial	Headquarter functions and core-engineering
Méaulte	France	Industrial	Nose assembly and large composite
Rochefort	France	Industrial	Section assembly and seats
Saint-Nazaire	France	Industrial	Detailed parts
Mérignac	France	Industrial	Wings
Salaunes	France	Industrial	Composite detailed parts
M Ghira	Tunisia	Industrial	Detailed parts and assembly
Casablanca	Morocco	Industrial	Composite detailed parts and assembly
Lunenburg, Nova Scotia	Canada	Industrial	Composite detailed parts
Mirabel, Quebec	Canada	Industrial	Section assembly
Hamburg	Germany	Support office	Airbus Final Assembly Lines support
Bangkok	Thailand	Support office	Commercial offices
Seattle	USA	Support office	Commercial offices
Los Angeles	USA	Support office	Commercial offices
Miami	USA	Support office	Commercial offices, and airline support
United Arab Emirates	United Arab Emirates	Support office	Airline support
Singapore	Singapore	Support office	Airline support
Beijing	China	Support office	Airline support
