= Spirit AeroSystems =

American aerostructure manufacturing company

Spirit AeroSystems Holdings, Inc.
- Formerly: Mid-Western Aircraft Systems
- Type: Subsidiary
- Traded as: NYSE: SPR
- Industry: Aerospace
- Founded: 2005; 21 years ago
- Fate: Acquired by Boeing; partial asset transfer to Airbus completed
- Headquarters: Wichita, Kansas, U.S.
- Key people: Pat Shanahan (president & CEO); Irene Esteves (CFO)
- Revenue: ▲US$6.32 billion (2024)
- Operating income: ▼US$−1.79 billion (2024)
- Net income: ▲US$−2.14 billion (2024)
- Total assets: ▼US$6.76 billion (2024)
- Total equity: ▼US$−2.62 billion (2024)
- Number of employees: 20,370 (2024)
- Parent: Boeing
- Website: spiritaero.com
- Footnotes; Financials as of December 31, 2024. References

Spirit AeroSystems Holdings, Inc. is an American manufacturer of aerostructures for commercial airplanes, headquartered in Wichita, Kansas, and wholly owned by Boeing. The company produces fuselage sections for Boeing's 737 and 787 aircraft, as well as the flight deck sections for a majority of Boeing airliners. Spirit also supplies Airbus with fuselage sections and front wing spars for the A350 and wings for the A220. Spirit's primary competitors in the aerostructures market include Collins Aerospace, Kawasaki Heavy Industries, Leonardo, and Triumph Group.

Spirit AeroSystems was established in 2005 when Boeing spun-off its Wichita division to an investment firm. Boeing entered into an agreement to re-acquire Spirit in July 2024 for $4.7 billion. Concurrently with Boeing’s completed acquisition of Spirit AeroSystems, Spirit has transferred specific assets involved in Airbus production directly to Airbus under a definitive agreement announced in April 2025. As of December 2025, both transactions received the necessary regulatory approvals and closing conditions have been satisfied.

== History ==
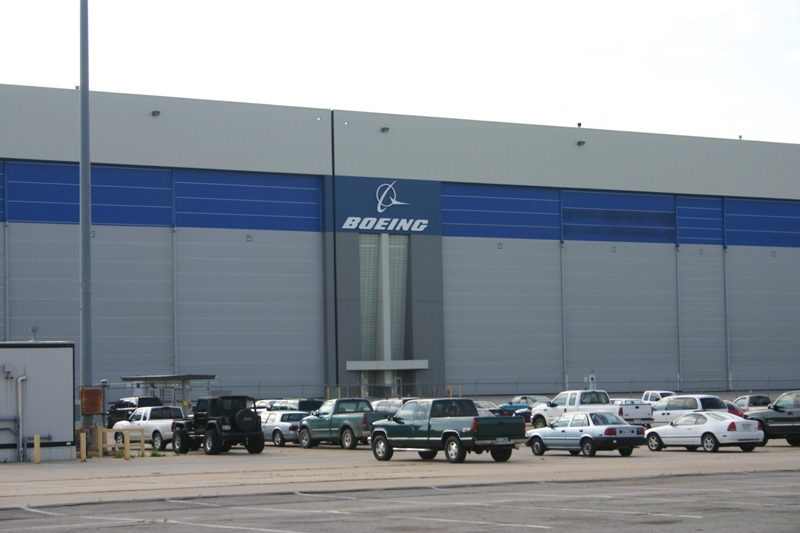
Wichita plant as seen in 2005, just before Spirit Aerosystems took control

Spirit was originally formed as Mid-Western Aircraft Systems when Boeing sold its Wichita factory along with facilities in Tulsa, Oklahoma and McAlester, Oklahoma to the investment firm Onex Corporation in June 2005 for US$900 million in cash and the assumption of $300 million in debt, a total of $1.2 billion in enterprise value. The company was renamed Spirit AeroSystems a few months later. The sale was part of a larger effort of Boeing to divest itself of assets, in pursuit of increased return on net assets, a metric focused on by CEO Harry Stonecipher, who had come from McDonnell Douglas.

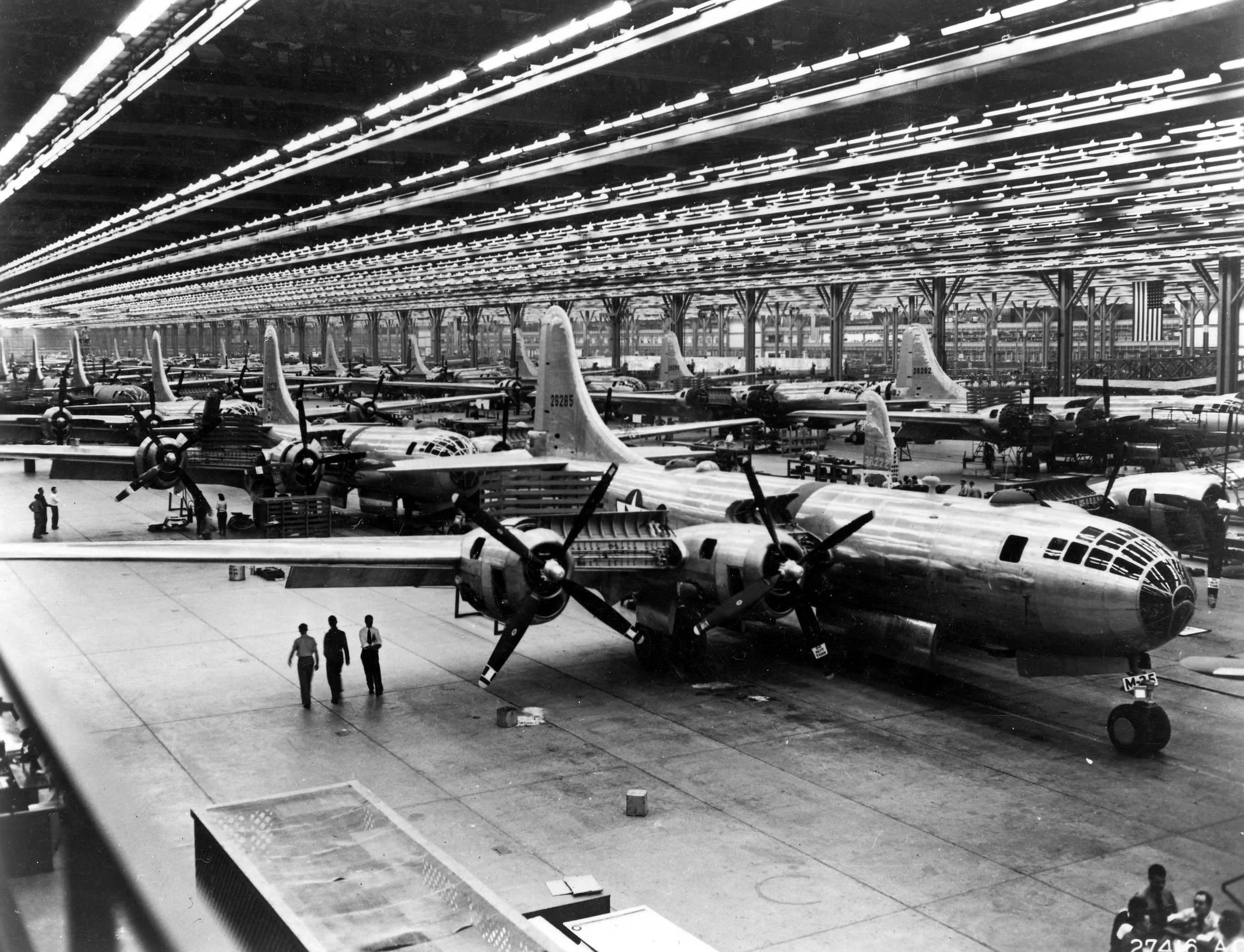
Boeing B-29 Superfortress assembly line in Wichita (1944)

The Wichita plant was originally founded as Stearman Aircraft in 1927 before being acquired by the United Aircraft and Transport Corporation (UATC) in 1929. Following the breakup of UATC in 1934, the plant was retained by Boeing and became the Wichita division of the Boeing Airplane Company in 1941. The Wichita division was responsible for the construction of several models of strategic bomber aircraft including the B-29 Superfortress, B-47 Stratojet, and B-52 Stratofortress. The Wichita factory primarily builds fuselage sections, including 70% of the structure for the Boeing 737.

The Tulsa plant was originally opened as a Douglas Aircraft Company facility to build bombers and other aircraft during World War II. When the war ended, Douglas mothballed the plant until 1953 when it reopened to assemble the B-47 StratoJet and the B-66 Destroyer. North American Aviation moved into about a third of the facility in 1962. The Tulsa plant builds wings and components for Boeing aircraft.

The McAlester factory opened in 1964 as North American Aviation facility, supported the company's Apollo capsule and B-1B Bomber projects, primarily focusing on machining operations in support of the Tulsa factory.

Over time North American and Douglas would both become part of Boeing, which took control of both Oklahoma factories in 1996. Operationally, they were wrapped into the Wichita division. However, Boeing long expressed interest in selling the Oklahoma factories. When they were spun-off to Spirit, again talks were held about selling the Oklahoma plants. However, nothing came of these talks. In 2020, Spirit announced it would close its McAlester plant, moving work to Tulsa and Wichita.

Under Onex ownership, Spirit's mandate was to build a portfolio of business with customers other than Boeing. In January 31, 2006, BAE Systems announced it had agreed to sell its aerostructures business, based at Glasgow Prestwick Airport and Samlesbury Aerodrome, to Spirit. The unit is a major supplier to Airbus (80%), Boeing (15%) and Raytheon (5%). The transaction was completed on April 1, 2006. Spirit paid £80,000,000 (equivalent to £141,473,912 in 2025) for the business. In 2009, Spirit opened a plant in Subang, Malaysia out of a need for expansion and to take pressure off the Prestwick facility. Spirit opened a composites manufacturing facility in Kinston, North Carolina on July 1, 2010, to build sections of the Airbus A350. Those sections are then sent to another Spirit plant in Saint-Nazaire, France, where they are partially assembled before being sent on to Airbus in Toulouse for final assembly. During this time, Spirit also won the contract to build the wings for the Gulfstream G280 and G650.

Onex sold its final shares of Spirit in 2014 and at that time it has made $3.2 billion on its ownership of the company.

On October 31, 2019, Spirit acquired Bombardier Aviation's aerostructures activities and aftermarket services operations in Belfast (a former Short Brothers plant) and Casablanca, with the acquisition completing a year later in October 2020. The deal gives Spirit a bigger place in Airbus' supply chain as the Belfast plant produces the wings for the Airbus A220, while the Casablanca factory produces the mid-fuselage for the A220.

In February 2020, Spirit acquired Fiber Materials Inc., a company which specializes in making high-temperature materials and composites, primarily for the defense and space industry, operating out of facilities in Biddeford, Maine and Woonsocket, Rhode Island. In July 2021, the company purchased Applied Aerodynamics, an aerostructures maintenance, repair and overhaul (MRO) facility in Dallas.

=== Boeing re-acquisition and Airbus asset transfer ===
After years of losses and quality control problems at Spirit, Boeing started talks to re-acquire Spirit AeroSystems in January 2024. At the time, both Boeing and Spirit faced intense scrutiny after an uncontrolled decompression on Alaska Airlines Flight 1282, that occurred when a door plug (a structure installed to replace an optional emergency exit door) on the Boeing 737 MAX 9 aircraft, which was not bolted in place due to a manufacturing error, blew out.

After months of talks, Boeing agreed in late June 2024 to buy back Spirit AeroSystems in an all-stock transaction, worth $4.7 billion in equity value and $8.3 billion in enterprise value when including the assumption of Spirit's debt. The conclusion of this deal was announced in Dec 2025.

Boeing took over operations in Wichita, Dallas, Tulsa, Prestwick and non-Airbus parts of the Belfast site. Spirit previously stated its intention to divest Fiber Materials (Biddeford and Woonsocket sites).

In January 2025, Tex-Tech Industries announced it had completed the acquisition of Fiber Materials Inc. and its facilities in Biddeford and Woonsocket from Spirit.

On April 28, 2025, Spirit announced a definitive agreement with Airbus to transfer ownership of certain assets and sites involved in Airbus aerostructure production directly to Airbus. This transfer is expected to close concurrently with the Boeing acquisition, with both transactions now anticipated to finalize in the third quarter of 2025, pending regulatory approvals and other closing conditions.

As part of this agreement, Airbus will take ownership of Spirit's sites in Kinston, North Carolina (A350 fuselage sections), St. Nazaire, France (A350 fuselage sections), and Casablanca, Morocco (A321 and A220 components). Airbus will also acquire the production assets for A320 and A350 wing components in Prestwick, Scotland, A220 pylon production in Wichita, Kansas, and A220 wing production in Belfast, Northern Ireland.

The agreement stipulated that Airbus would also acquire the A220 mid-fuselage production in Belfast if a suitable alternative buyer for this specific operation was not identified before the transaction closed. The small non-Airbus operation at Prestwick, consisting of around 50 employees, would transfer to Boeing, and the facility at Subang, Malaysia was planned to be divested to a yet-to-be-identified third-party.

Concurrent with the asset transfer agreement, Spirit and Airbus entered into a memorandum of agreement where Airbus agreed to provide Spirit with non-interest-bearing lines of credit totaling $200 million to support ongoing Airbus programs during the transition period.

In July 2025, Spirit announced that the search for a third-party buyer for the A220 mid-fuselage production and the non-Airbus operations at Belfast had been unsuccessful. As a result, on completion of the Boeing–Spirit acquisition, the A220 mid-fuselage production at Belfast would transfer to Airbus (together with the previously announced Airbus acquisition of A220 wing production there), and the remainder of the Belfast operation (consisting mainly of fuselage production for Bombardier Aviation's range of business jet aircraft) would transfer to Boeing.

== Operations after the acquisition ==
When the Boeing and Airbus transactions closed on December 8, 2025, about 15,000 Spirit employees joined Boeing, more than 4,000 joined Airbus, and the Malaysian plant was sold to Composites Technology Research Malaysia (CTRM). The Federal Trade Commission (FTC) had made the Airbus and CTRM divestitures a condition of clearing the deal.

=== Boeing ===
Boeing took over Spirit's Boeing-related commercial work, including 737 fuselages, major structures for the 767, 777, and 787, and the fuselages for the P-8 and KC-46 military aircraft. Commercial manufacturing was placed under Boeing Commercial Airplanes and the aftermarket business under Boeing Global Services. The Wichita plant reverted to the Boeing name, and in May 2026 Boeing announced a $1 billion investment in its Wichita facilities over three years.

Boeing also acquired the non-Airbus part of the Belfast operation, with about 2,400 employees. It operates as an independent subsidiary, "Short Brothers, a Boeing Company", reporting to Boeing Global Services, and builds business jet structures including fuselage sections, engine nacelles, and horizontal stabilizers.

=== Spirit Defense ===
Spirit's defense business became Spirit Defense, a "non-integrated" subsidiary of Boeing Defense, Space & Security. It is aligned with Boeing for financial reporting and some support functions but keeps separate governance and operations so that it can continue supplying other defense contractors, including Boeing's competitors. The FTC order requires Spirit to keep supplying competing military aircraft contractors, bars it from favoring Boeing over them, and requires it to protect their confidential information. The unit is based in Wichita; as of October 2026, its president and chief executive was Keith Schrader.

Spirit Defense builds aerostructures for the Northrop Grumman B-21 Raider and fuselages for the Sikorsky CH-53K King Stallion. Bell moved fuselage production for its Future Long-Range Assault Aircraft tiltrotor in-house after the acquisition was announced in 2024. In October 2026, General Atomics Aeronautical Systems named Spirit Defense as fuselage design-build partner for the FQ-42 Vengeance, an uncrewed Collaborative Combat Aircraft, and Spirit Defense unveiled a 50,000-square-foot (4,600 m^{2}) building in Wichita to produce the fuselages.

=== Airbus and CTRM ===
Airbus took over the operations dedicated to its aircraft programs and received $439 million in compensation. The A350 fuselage plants in Kinston, North Carolina, and Saint-Nazaire, France, became Airbus Aerosystems Kinston and Airbus Atlantic Cadréan; the Casablanca plant became Airbus Atlantic Maroc Aero; A220 wing and mid-fuselage production in Belfast became Airbus Belfast; and the wing-component work at Prestwick became an affiliate, Prestwick Aerosystems. Airbus said A220 pylon production would move from Wichita to Toulouse.

The plant in Subang, Malaysia, which supplied both Airbus and Boeing and employed more than 1,000 people, was sold to CTRM, a subsidiary of DRB-HICOM, for $95.2 million.

== Business ==
In 2010, 96% of Spirit's revenue came from its two largest customers: 85% of sales were from Boeing, 11% from Airbus.

After planning to take Spirit public, at initial public offering on November 21, 2006, the firm's stock rose 10% on the first day. In November 2006, Onex owned 58% of Spirit, which resulted in 92% of voting power, as its shares conferred "supervoting" power. The chief architect of the Onex purchase of Spirit was Nigel S. Wright, who was later Chief of Staff for the Canadian Prime Minister until his resignation as part of an expense scandal. In August 2014 the Onex Group sold all of its remaining shares of Spirit. Over the course of the nine-year investment, the Onex Group received aggregate proceeds of approximately $3.2 billion on its initial $375 million investment.

== Products ==
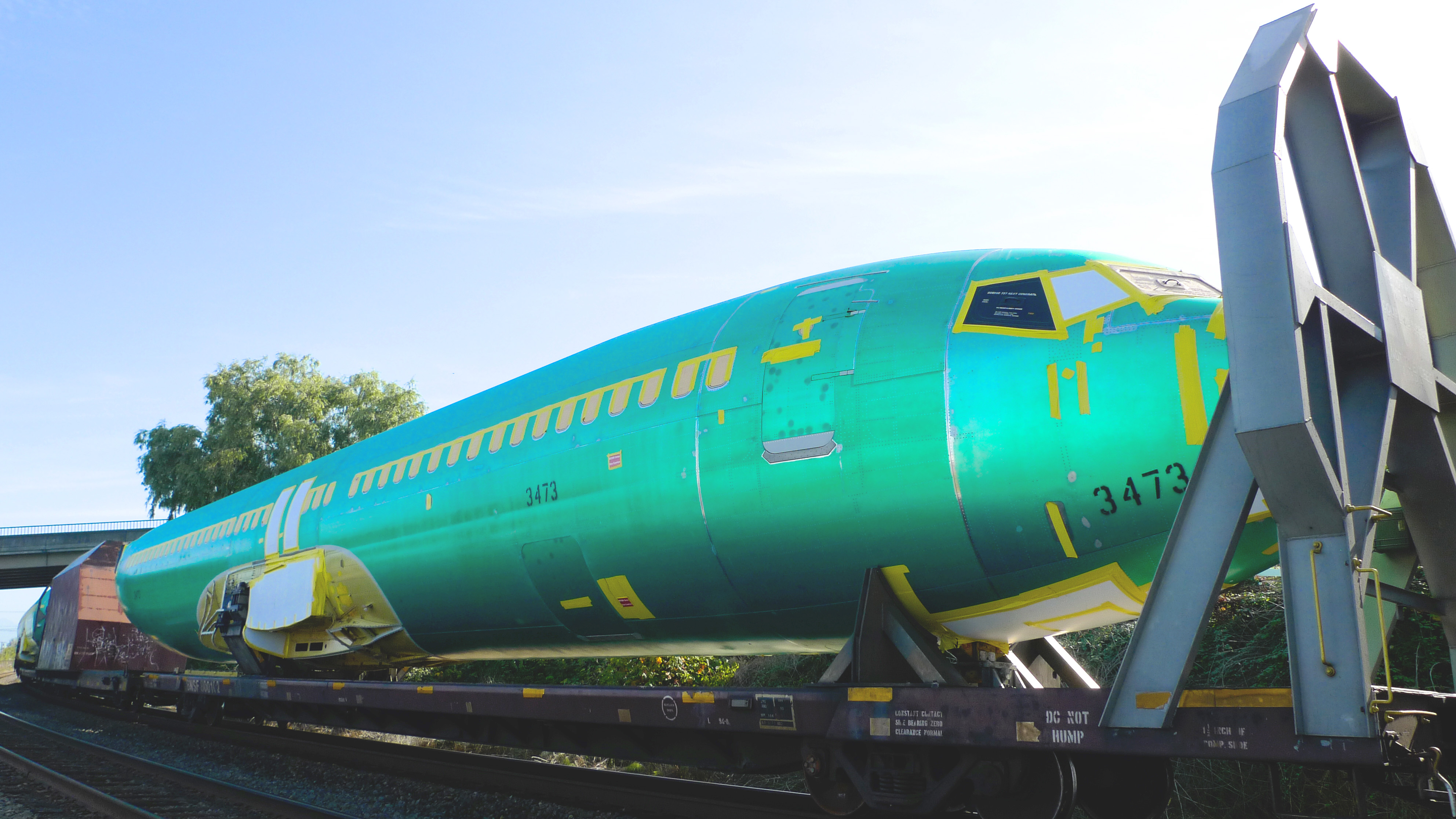
The Boeing 737 fuselage, built at Wichita's Spirit AeroSystems, being shipped to final assembly in the Seattle, Washington area.

Spirit's principal products are metal and composite structural sub-assemblies ("aerostructures") for Boeing, Airbus, and Bombardier airliners, as well as business aircraft (and their military variants). It also provides various other aerospace products and services.

Spirit's initial and continuing role has primarily been the manufacture of the Boeing 737 fuselage and other components, as well as the nose and forward-cabin sections of most Boeing jetliners. The Boeing sub-assemblies are mostly built at Spirit's former Boeing-Wichita factory complex, near its headquarters in Wichita, Kansas. Spirit also manufactures major fuselage and/or wing sub-assemblies for current Airbus jetliners, mostly in its Tulsa, Oklahoma factory (prior to planned acquisition/transfer).

Spirit also manufactures parts and sub-assemblies for various other aircraft manufacturers at various sites in the United States and the United Kingdom—including the fuselages of the Sikorsky CH-53K heavy-lift helicopter. It also produces or adapts various other defense-related aerospace products for other manufacturers.

== Manufacturing facilities ==
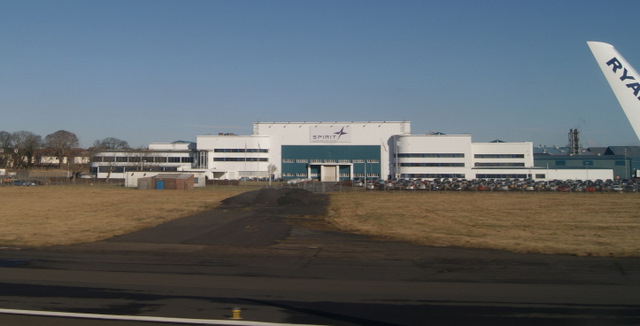
Prestwick plant (2010)

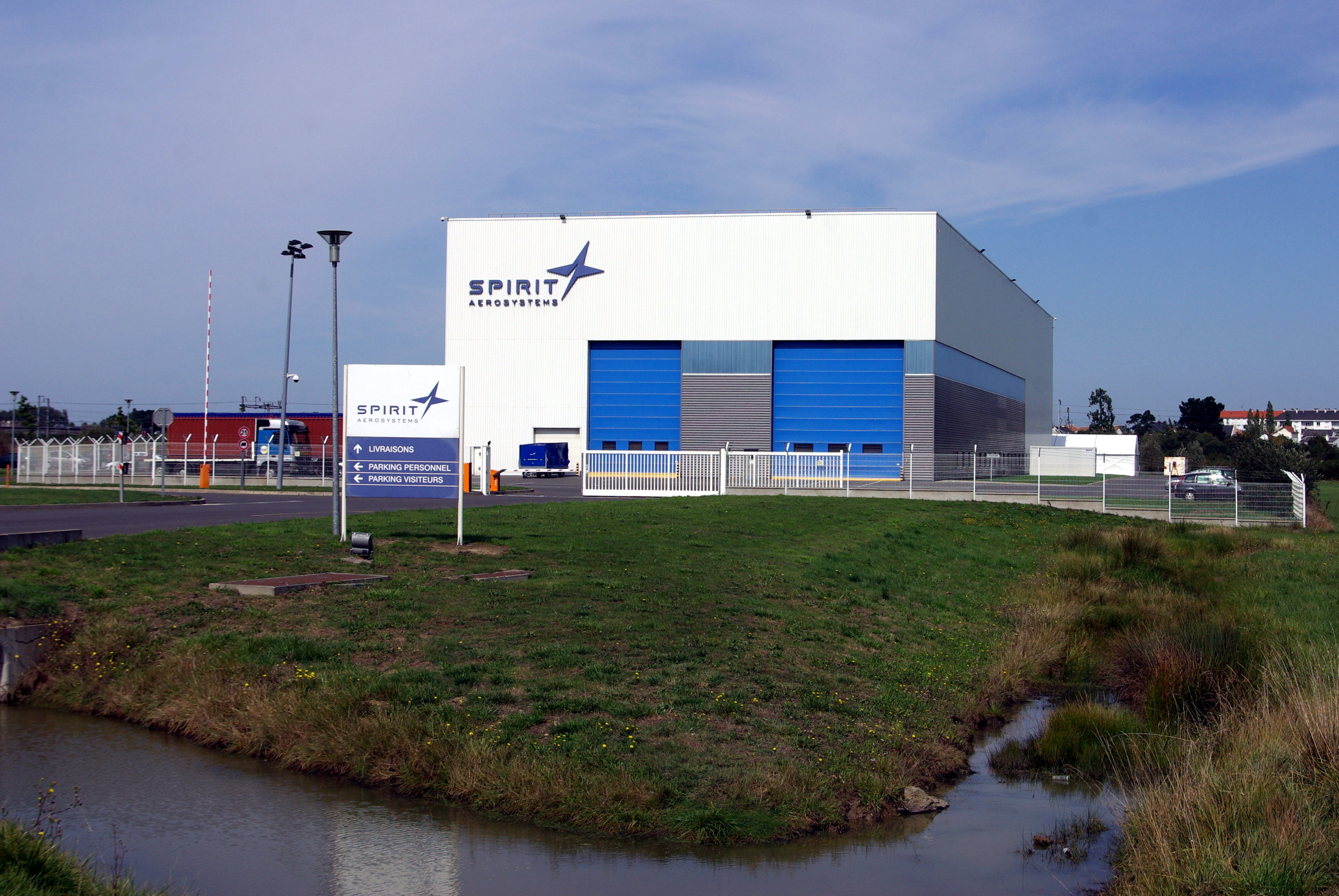
Saint-Nazaire plant (2015)

United States

- Wichita, Kansas (ex-Boeing; Expected transfer to Boeing, excluding A220 pylon production transferring to Airbus)
- Biddeford, Maine (Fiber Materials Inc.; divested January 2025 to Tex-Tech Industries)
- Woonsocket, Rhode Island (Fiber Materials Inc.; divested January 2025 to Tex-Tech Industries)
- Dallas, Texas (ex-Applied Aerodynamics, aftermarket services; Expected transfer to Boeing)
- Kinston, North Carolina (Transferring to Airbus)
- Tulsa, Oklahoma (ex-Boeing; Expected transfer to Boeing)

United Kingdom

- Belfast, Northern Ireland (Short Brothers, ex-Bombardier; A220 wing and mid-fuselage production transferring to Airbus; remainder of operations to Boeing)
- Prestwick, Scotland (ex-BAE Systems; Production for A320/A350 wings transferring to Airbus; remainder of operations to Boeing)

France

- Saint-Nazaire (Transferring to Airbus)

Malaysia

- Subang (accqusition by CTRM Aero)

Morocco

- Casablanca (ex-Bombardier; Transferring to Airbus)

== Incidents and safety concerns ==
In December 2023, an employee of Spirit AeroSystems filled out a class action in federal court against the company, alleging that former employees repeatedly warned about safety problems and were told to cover up systematic quality control failures, undercount defects, records falsification and retaliation against employees raising safety concerns.

On January 5, 2024, Alaska Airlines Flight 1282 experienced a midair emergency when a door plug blew out causing an uncontrolled decompression of the aircraft. The fuselage and door plug are manufactured and initially assembled by Spirit AeroSystems, then shipped by train for final assembly at the Boeing Renton Factory.
