= Airbus Atlantic =

Aeronautics company

- Industry: Aircraft Manufacturer
- Founded: October 26, 1970; 55 years ago
- Headquarters: Toulouse, France
- Net income: EUR€3.8 million (2022)
- Owner: Airbus Group
- Number of employees: 13,000 (2022)
- Website: airbus.com/en/airbus-atlantic

Airbus Atlantic is an aeronautics company, fully owned by the Airbus Group. The company was created on January 1, 2022 with the merging of Stelia Aerospace (ex Aerolia and ex Sogerma) and the Airbus-owned factories in Bouguenais and Montoir-de-Bretagne. It is headquartered in Colomiers, France.

Airbus Atlantic focuses on the creation and manufacturing of aerostructures, and seats for Airbus pilots and passengers of first and business classes.

Airbus Atlantic is a wholly owned subsidiary of Airbus Group whose customers include aircraft manufacturers including Airbus, Boeing, Bombardier, Embraer, Dassault, as well as around fifty airlines worldwide including Air France, Singapore Airlines, Turkish Airlines, Etihad Airways, Thai Airways International.

It has more than 13,000 employees, grouped on three continents. Its management and central functions are based in Toulouse, France.

== History ==
=== Sogerma ===
The history of SOGERMA dates back to the establishment in 1924 in Bordeaux (in the Bacalan district) of the company Dyle et Bacalan. The aeronautical department was absorbed in 1929 by the company Nieuport Delage, and became a subsidiary under the name Société agricole bordelaise (SAB).

SAB became independent in 1934. In 1935, the Bloch-Potez group incorporated SAB. With the nationalization of the aeronautics sector in 1936 and 1937, the companies were grouped together and became SNCASO, which employed 3,000 people and included three Bordeaux factories (Bègles, which manufactured spare parts, Bacalan, which carried out the assembly of large assemblies, and Mérignac, which assembled aircraft).

The Bacalan factory was completely razed in 1942 by Allied bombing. January 5, 1944, it was the Mérignac factory that was almost completely destroyed. At the Liberation, activity resumed in Mérignac as well as the reconstruction of the factory. In 1949, SNCASO made its overhaul, maintenance and conversion activities for all types of aircraft into subsidiaries and the Mérignac factory became the headquarters of the French Society for the Maintenance and Repair of Aeronautical Equipment (SFERMA). Little by little, the activity of the Bègles factory moved to Mérignac. From 1950, the Mérignac factory was equipped to accommodate large transport aircraft.

In 1957, SNCASO and SNCASE merged to form Sud-Aviation . In 1958, with the Algerian War, the military market offered SFERMA new opportunities. It now equipped aircraft and transformed radio equipment. SFERMA was absorbed in 1965 by its parent company, Sud-Aviation, and became its Maintenance and Repair Group (GER). It was also in 1965 that the first Caravelle came in for overhaul.

In 1970, the National Society of Aeronautical and Space Industries (SNIAS, renamed Aérospatiale in 1985) was created with the merger of Sud-Aviation, Nord-Aviation and the company for the Study and Production of Ballistic Engines (SEREB). On October 1st, the Mérignac factory regained its financial autonomy and became the Girondine Society for the Maintenance and Repair of Aeronautical Equipment (SOGERMA), specializing in aeronautical maintenance. The activities on aerostructures and seats were inherited from the acquisition of the Charentaise Society of Aeronautical Equipment (SOCEA, historically linked to Lioré and Olivier ) of Rochefort in 1988. In 2000 it became a subsidiary of EADS.

In 2006, a restructuring led to the withdrawal of its MRO ( Maintenance Repair and Overhaul ) activities, which joined Sabena Technics,TAT group. After this step, the company focused on developing its aerostructures, seats and armchairs activities.

After 2006, Sogerma benefited from a favorable situation in the aerostructures market, with a sharp increase in the production rates of the Airbus and ATR programs, and new contracts won, such as the central landing gear bay of the A350 or section 14A of the A321. In 2010, the company purchased a large area of property in Rochefort formerly owned by of Zodiac Aerospace, which ceased operations in 2008. In 2013, Sogerma continued to develop its Premium passenger seat business, with the establishment of new production areas and offices in Rochefort.
