= Airbus BelugaXL =

2020 large cargo aircraft

Airbus A330-743L BelugaXL
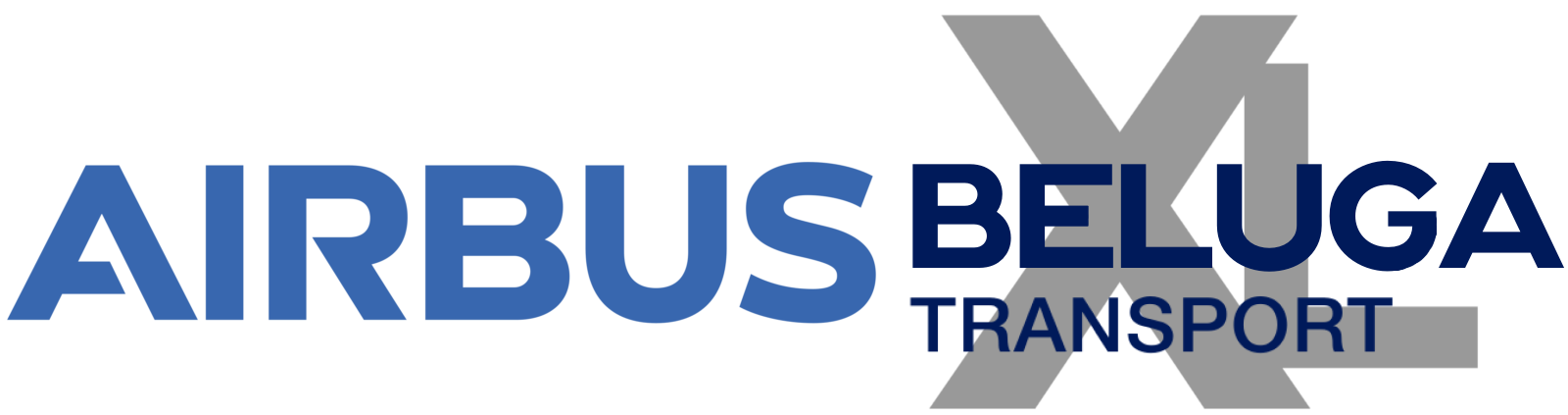

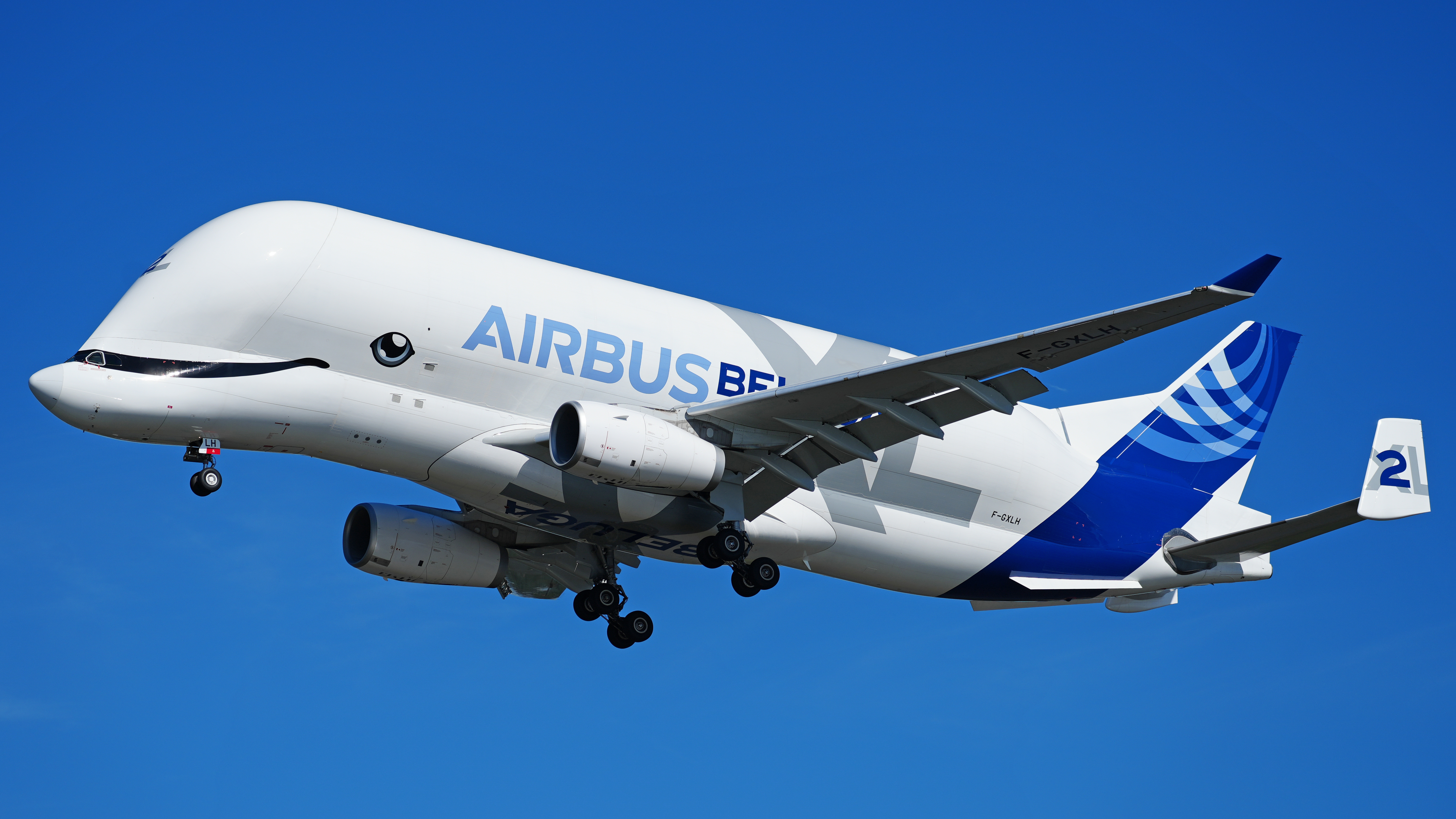
- The BelugaXL is based on the Airbus A330-200F with an enlarged upper fuselage

General information
- Type: Outsize freight aircraft
- Manufacturer: Airbus
- Status: In service
- Primary user: Airbus Transport International
- Number built: 6

History
- Manufactured: 2016–2023
- First flight: 19 July 2018
- In service: 9 January 2020
- Developed from: Airbus A330; Airbus Beluga

The Airbus A330-743L BelugaXL is a large transport aircraft based on the Airbus A330-200 built by Airbus. The aircraft made its first flight on 19 July 2018, and received its type certification on 13 November 2019. The BelugaXL entered service with Airbus Transport on 9 January 2020. It is scheduled to fully replace the Airbus Beluga, based on the older Airbus A300-600, in 2027.

== Development ==
By 2013, the five original BelugaSTs could not cope with Airbus production growth, and the manufacturer evaluated the Antonov An-124 and An-225, Boeing C-17 and Dreamlifter, and A400M, before choosing to modify one of its own aircraft. The programme was launched in November 2014 to build five aircraft to replace the five existing BelugaSTs; the design freeze was announced on 16 September 2015. The program cost is €1 billion for development and production.

=== Fleet ===
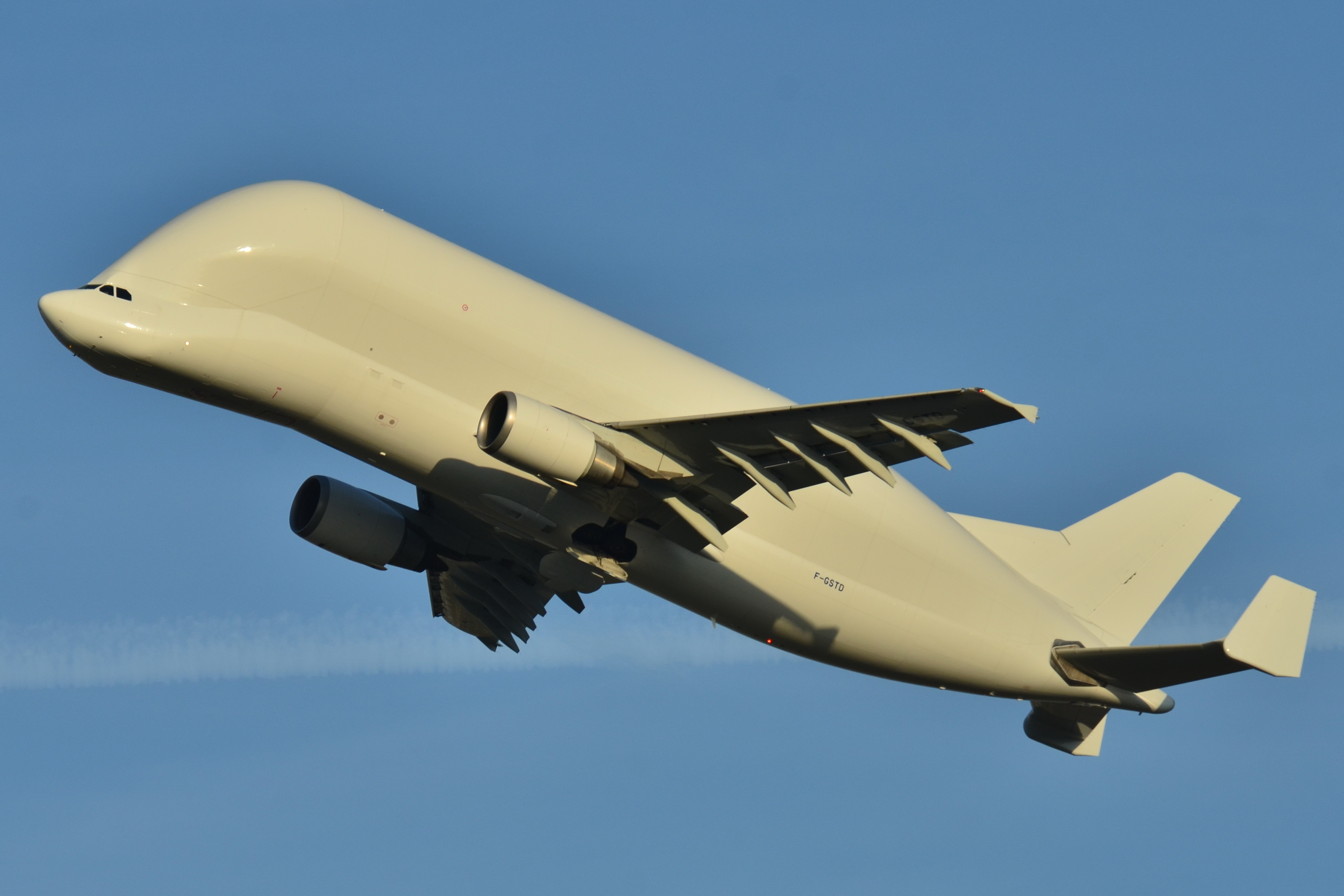
Airbus Beluga, the BelugaXL's predecessor

The original BelugaSTs were not to be withdrawn from service after introduction of the BelugaXL's in 2019; a mixed fleet was to operate as the increased production rate of single-aisle aircraft requires the ability to move more parts. All five aircraft were retired from Airbus service in 2023.

The combined Beluga fleet rose to eight aircraft with the deliveries of the first three XLs, as the five original aircraft stayed in service, until Airbus to begin withdrawal from 2021. The BelugaST fleet was reaching its limits, flying five times daily, and six days per week, for 10,000 hours in 2017, while some parts are moved over land. The time required for a BelugaST to move the parts of an A320 was three times as long as for the BelugaXL, and nine times longer for A350 parts.

After an Airbus A350 production increase, Airbus aimed to deliver 880 aircraft in 2019, and raise A320neo output to 63 per month by 2021; the BelugaXL fleet was expanded with a sixth aircraft in June 2019. Airbus considered options such as offering the BelugaSTs for sale or for service to external customers before the Beluga XL entered into service.

=== Production ===
The aircraft's lower fuselage was assembled on the Airbus A330 final assembly line, then moved to another facility for the year-long process of assembling the upper fuselage and the lowered nose fuselage. The first section arrived in Toulouse in November 2016. Final aircraft assembly started on 8 December 2016. The first large sections: one central and two lateral rear section panels, arrived on 12 April 2017 at the Toulouse Final Assembly facility (L34) from Aernnova's factory in Berantevilla, Spain.

Constructed by Airbus subsidiary Stelia Aerospace in Meaulte, its 12 m × 4 m (39 ft × 13 ft), 8.2 t (18,000 lb) nose section was delivered in May 2017. The 9 m (30 ft) wide, 8 m (26 ft) long and high, 2.1 t (4,600 lb) upper front fuselage part, framing the cargo door, was delivered from Stelia Rochefort on 7 July 2017. The 3.1 t (3.1 long tons; 3.4 short tons), 10 m (33 ft) long and 8 m (26 ft) high door was delivered by Stelia Rochefort in September 2017.

In October 2017, 75% of the first BelugaXL structural assembly was complete; with systems, mechanical, and electrical integration underway before integration of the tail elements, which had already been received. After mating the vertical fin, tail cone and horizontal stabiliser including the outboard vertical surfaces, the main freight door was to be attached from mid-November, before power-on at the end of 2017.

The BelugaXL's maiden flight was scheduled for summer 2018 before undergoing 10 months of flight tests necessary for its certification campaign, and a 2019 service entry. The flight test campaign used a single, instrumented aircraft. The front cargo door was attached in December 2017. In January 2018, the second arrived in Toulouse for its transformation, in two months less after lessons learned from the first. The three remaining aircraft were to follow each subsequent year.

=== Testing ===
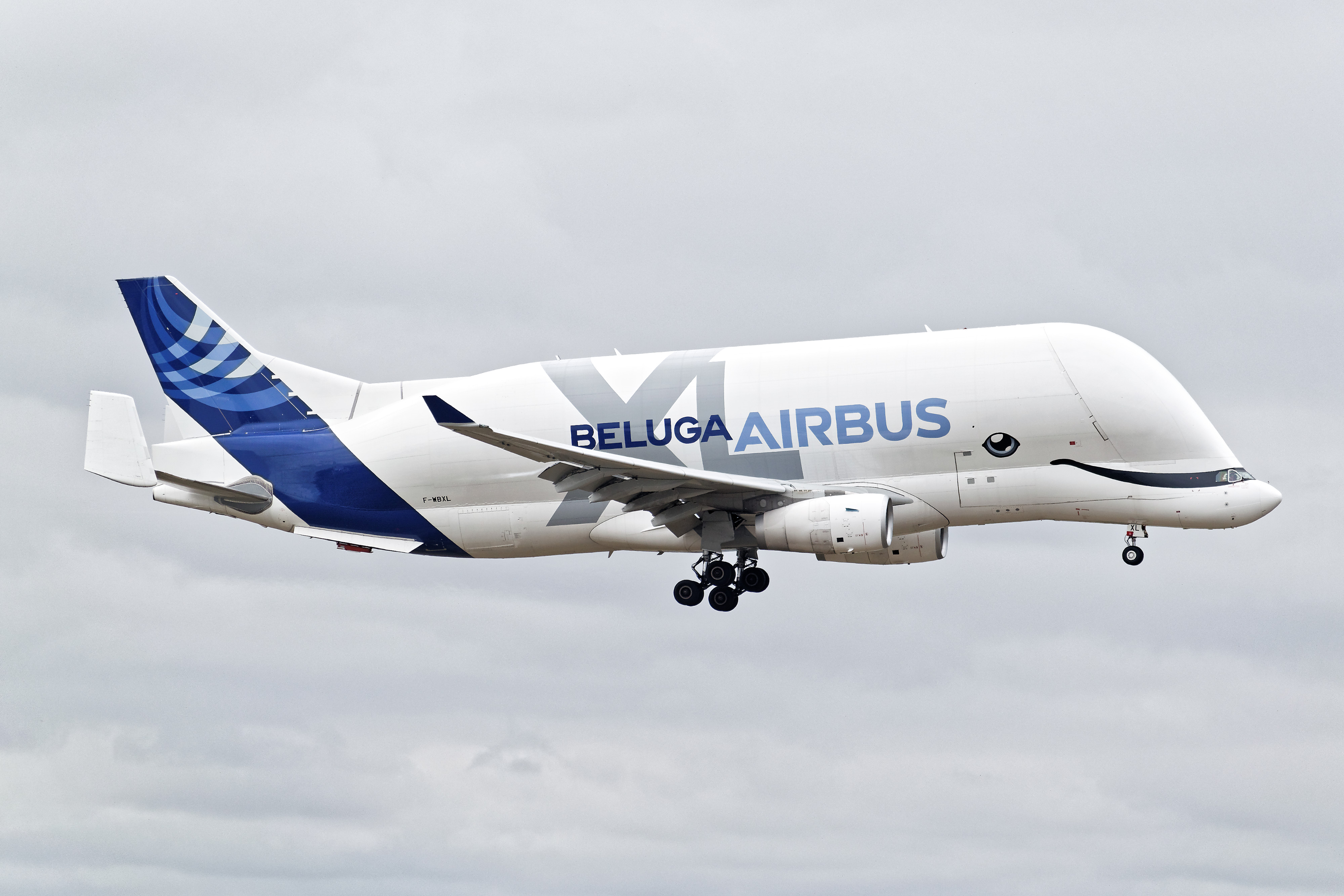
Airbus BelugaXL side profile

The first BelugaXL rolled off the assembly line on 4 January 2018, unpainted and without engines. Fewer than 1,000 flight test hours were planned for its certification campaign. After fitting its Rolls-Royce Trent 700 engines, it was ground tested for months to assess its systems operation, while bench tests in Toulouse and Hamburg, on flight simulators and in laboratories, simulated flight loads on full-scale copies of specific joints between the upper bubble and the lower fuselage, clearing the aircraft for flight, then type certification.

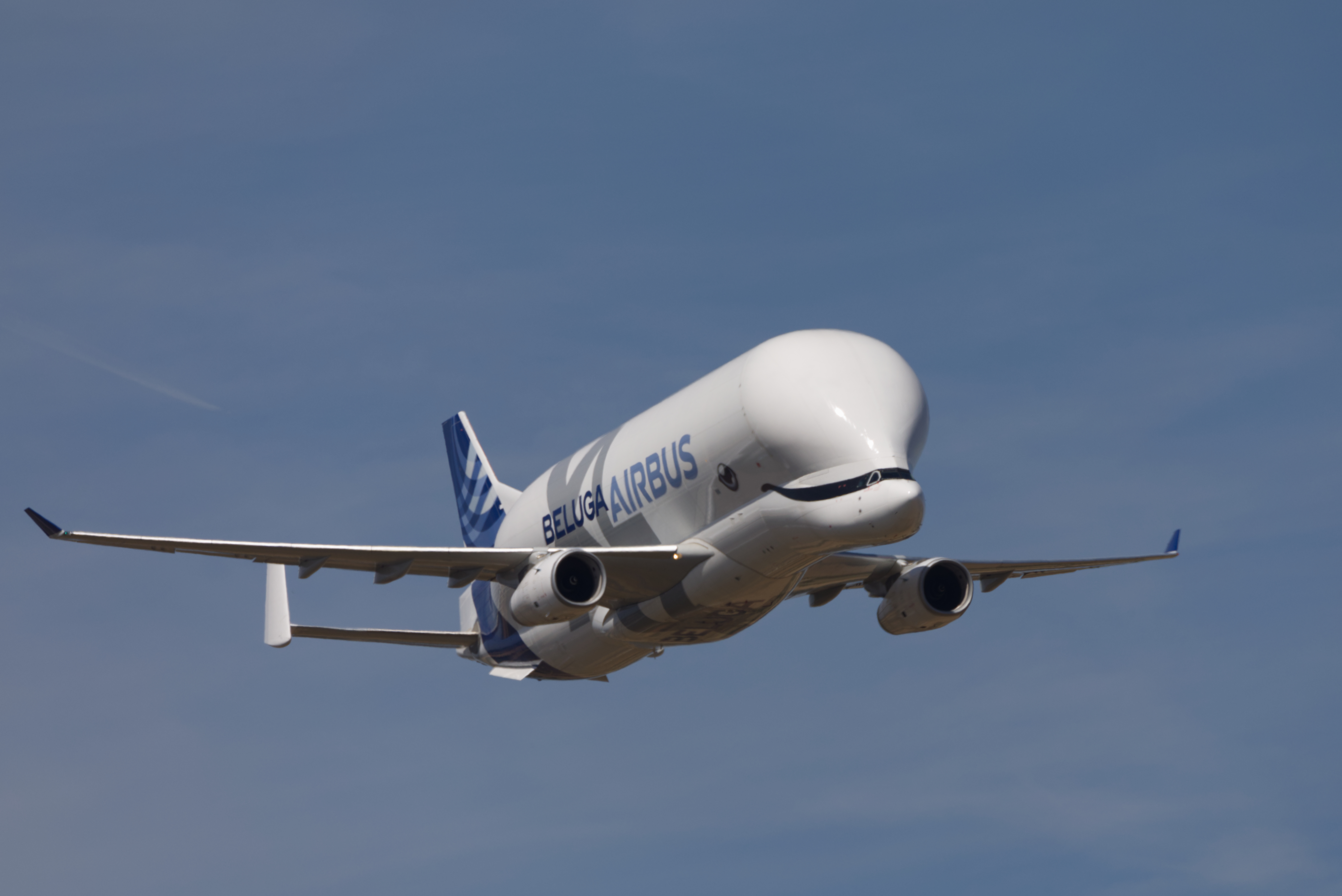
The BelugaXL performing at the 2022 Royal International Air Tattoo.

In March 2018, the first BelugaXL (MSN1824) was having its engines fitted, while the second (MSN1853) was 30% converted. After successful landing gear and flight-control system checks, MSN1824 was to be fuelled and ground tested. The third was expected to begin its conversion before the end of 2018. MSN1853 was to be first operational in 2019, after proving work in 11 European stations, while MSN1824 flight instrumentation was to be disassembled. It was rolled out with its Rolls-Royce Trent 700 engines but no winglets in April 2018.

It passed the ground vibration test in early June 2018, with Office National d'Etudes et de Recherches Aérospatiales (ONERA) and Deutsches Zentrum für Luft- und Raumfahrt (DLR) measuring its dynamic behaviour compared to flight envelope theoretical models. The flight-test programme was expected to last 600 hours. The second aircraft had its lower fuselage completed by mid-June, before upper shell structural work and freight door fitting after summer, for completion by September or October. The first flight was on 19 July 2018, from Blagnac, Toulouse, France. In February 2019, the first aircraft flew to various destinations, including Airbus's wing plants in Bremen, Germany and Broughton, Wales.

The first BelugaXL to enter service was the second aircraft built, which rolled out on 19 March 2019; the first test aircraft was to be retro-fitted after certification. The second aircraft (MSN1853) commenced flight testing on 15 April, and by then, the first (MSN1824) had completed more than 140 test flights over 500 hours, the final stage before certification. A third airframe was undergoing conversion, expected to last until the fourth quarter of 2019, for delivery in 2020. Operations were expected to start with two XLs in the second half of 2019.

After more than 200 flight tests over 700 hours, the BelugaXL received its European Aviation Safety Agency (EASA) type certification on 13 November 2019.

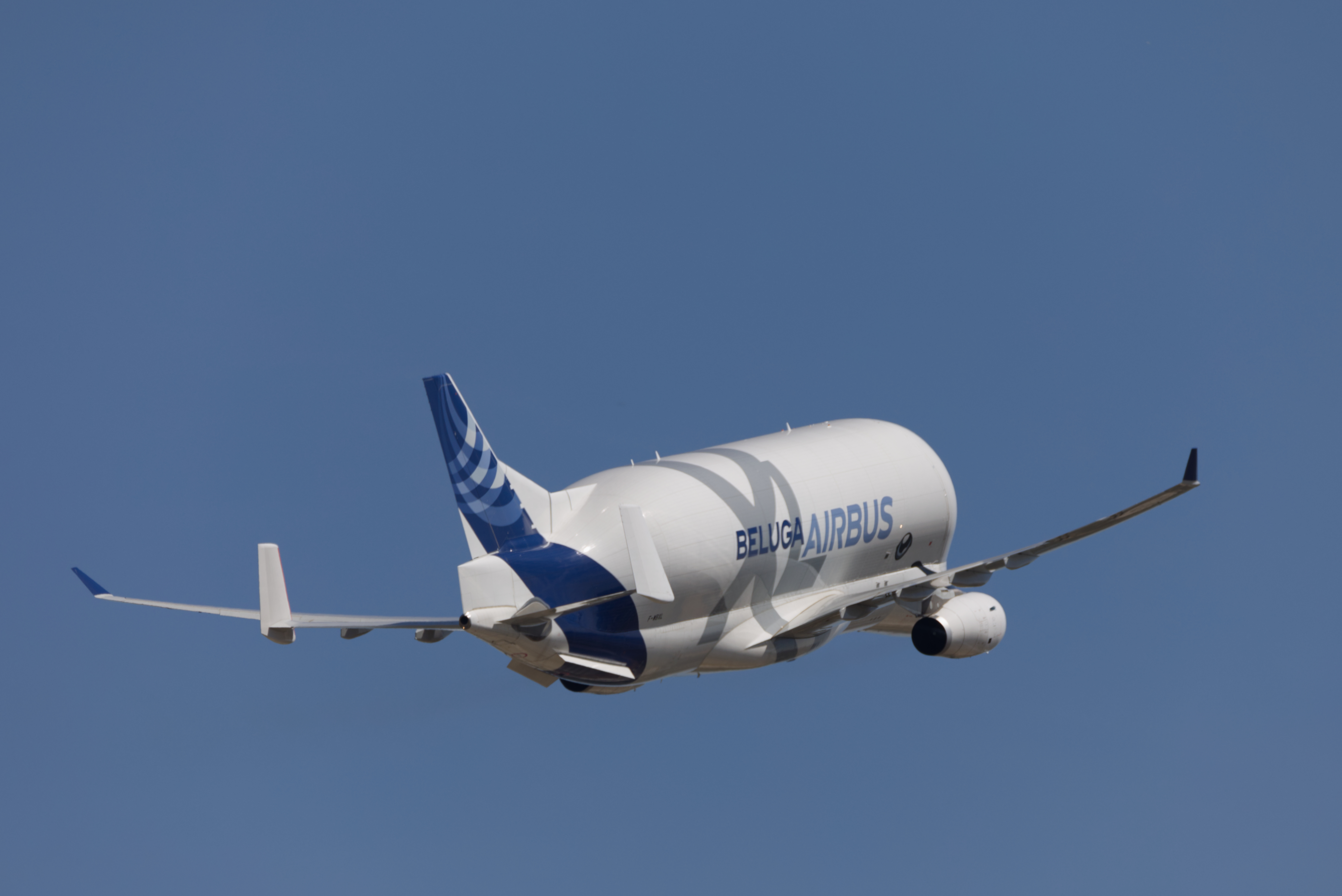
The BelugaXL maneuvering at the 2022 RIAT.

The last two BelugaXLs to be produced are expected to have 180-minute ETOPS approval, allowing them to be used for transatlantic flights, typically to transport satellites to North American launch sites. As of February 2021, tests were being conducted to gain approval for the XL's autoland capacity.

== Operations ==
Airbus started operating the first BelugaXL on 9 January 2020, with all six freighters scheduled to be operating by the end of 2023, it planned to start phase out the previous A300-600STs from 2021.

== Design ==
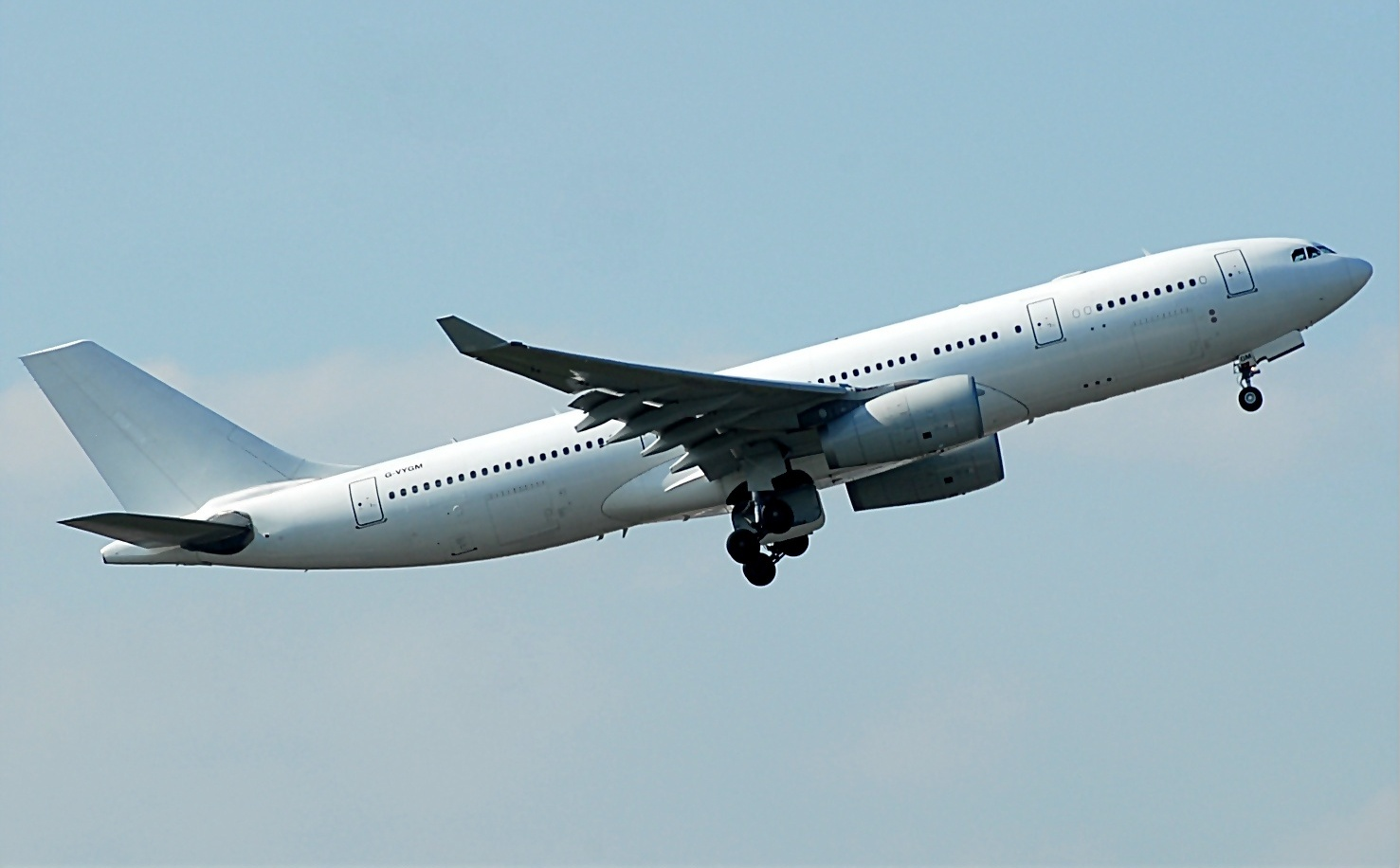
The Airbus A330, on which the BelugaXL is based

With 30% more capacity than the original BelugaST, the BelugaXL can carry two A350 XWB wings instead of one. Its new fuselage is 6.9 m (23 ft) longer and 1.7 m (5 ft 7 in) wider than the original BelugaST, and it can lift a payload 6 t (5.9 long tons; 6.6 short tons) heavier. Its aft section is based on the A330-300, while its forward is based on the A330-200 for centre of gravity reasons, and the reinforced floor and structure is derived from the A330-200 Freighter. The A330 wings, main landing-gear, central and aft fuselage form a semi-built platform with few systems, without the aft upper fuselage, while the upper central fuselage is cut off, facilitated by the metal construction. The enlarged freight hold is mounted in three months with 8,000 new parts on the junction line.

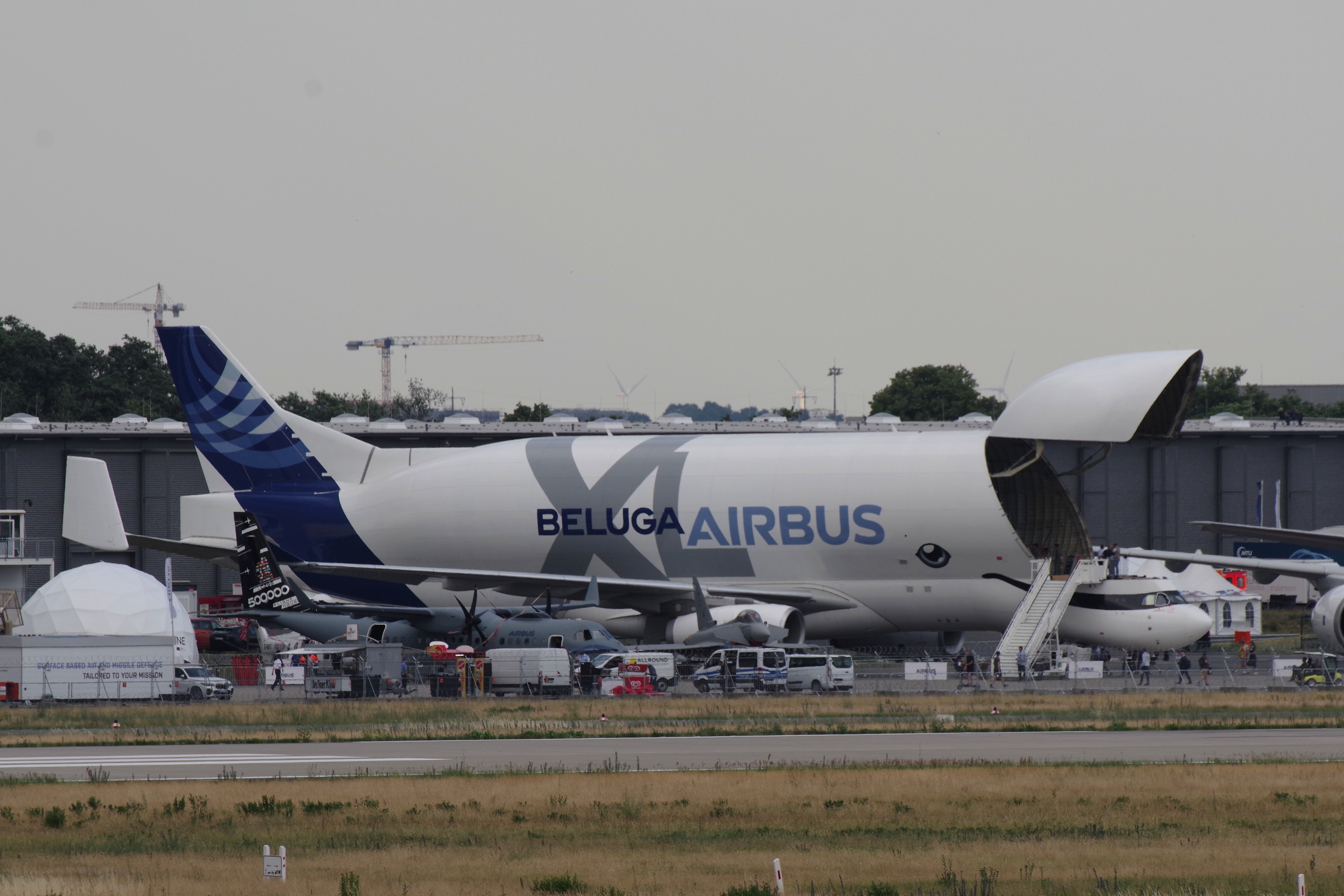
The BelugaXL with its opened cargo hold.

The unpressurised hold begins with adaptation of the tail by Spain's Aernnova, followed by manufacture of the upper fuselage with two side panels and a crown for each section, for a maximum diameter of 8.8 m (29 ft). Produced by Stelia Aerospace, its main freight door has 24 latches, and the nose includes the cockpit, while a four-seat courier section is supplied by Airbus. Its vertical stabiliser is 50% larger; it has auxiliary fins on the horizontal stabiliser, and two ventral fins beneath the empennage.

The BelugaXL operates at Mach 0.69 up to 35,000 ft (11,000 m) over 2,300 nmi (4,300 km; 2,600 mi) instead of the original Beluga's 900 nmi (1,700 km; 1,000 mi). Deharde Aerospace and the P3 group provide the upper fuselage, while Aciturri produces the horizontal tail plane extension, auxiliary and ventral fins.

== Specifications ==
Data from Airbus.

General characteristics

- Capacity: 50,500 kg (111,333 lb) payload
- Length: 63.1 m (207 ft 0 in)
- Wingspan: 60.3 m (197 ft 10 in)
- Height: 18.9 m (62 ft 0 in)
- Wing area: 361.6 m^{2} (3,892 sq ft)
- Aspect ratio: 10.1
- Empty weight: 127,500 kg (281,089 lb)
- Max takeoff weight: 227,000 kg (500,449 lb)
- Fuel capacity: 73,000 kg (161,000 lb)
- Fuselage diameter: 8.8 m (29 ft)
- Cargo hold: 2,209 m^{3} (78,000 cu ft) volume
- Powerplant: 2 × Rolls-Royce Trent 700 turbofan, 316 kN (71,000 lbf) thrust each

Performance

- Cruise speed: 737 km/h (458 mph, 398 kn) , Mach 0.69 at FL350
- Range: 4,300 km (2,600 mi, 2,300 nmi) at max payload
- Service ceiling: 11,000 m (35,000 ft)

== See also ==
- List of civil aircraft

Related development

- Airbus A330 – Twin-aisle airliner family
- Airbus Beluga – Outsize cargo version of the A300-600 airliner

Aircraft of comparable role, configuration, and era

- Aero Spacelines Super Guppy – Larger turboprop version of outsize cargo aircraft Pregnant Guppy
- Antonov An-124 Ruslan – Soviet military transport aircraft
- Antonov An-225 Mriya – Soviet/Ukrainian heavy strategic cargo aircraft
- Boeing Dreamlifter – Outsize cargo conversion of the 747-400
