= Composite tooling =

Moulds and mandrels used to make composite parts

Composite tooling is the set of molds, mandrels and fixtures on which composite material parts are laid up, cured and machined. The tool defines the shape of the finished part and must hold it to tolerance through a cure cycle that, for aerospace carbon-fiber parts, typically reaches about 180 °C under autoclave pressure. The largest, the Invar mandrels on which airliner fuselage sections are built, weigh thousands of pounds.

== Requirements ==
A cure tool must present an accurate surface at cure temperature, so its thermal expansion relative to the part matters: a tool that grows more than the laminate on heating produces a part of the wrong size when both cool, and on large parts the difference can exceed the tolerance. Because composite laminates "spring in" slightly as they cool, tool angles are usually built a degree or two past the nominal part angle to compensate. The tool surface must be vacuum-tight so that no air leaks into the bagged laminate and causes porosity, and it must survive repeated heating, cooling, release-agent application and cleaning without distorting. Lighter tools heat and cool faster, which shortens the cure cycle and makes the tool easier to move.

== Materials ==
The usual tool materials are aluminum, steel, Invar, epoxy- and bismaleimide-based composites, and graphite or carbon foam. Aluminum and steel are cheap and easy to machine but expand far more than carbon-fiber laminates when heated, so they are used mainly for low-temperature cures, prototypes, or where the mismatch can be designed around. Invar, an iron–nickel alloy, expands at close to the rate of carbon-fiber composite up to about 200 °C and withstands thousands of autoclave cycles, which has made it the standard material for high-volume aerospace cure tooling; its drawbacks are cost, weight and lead time, which can approach a year for a large tool. Large Invar tools weigh thousands of pounds; one military tail-cone mandrel is cited at about 15,000 lb.

Composite tools, laid up from carbon-fiber tooling prepreg on a master model, have a thermal expansion close to the part's and weigh roughly 40 per cent as much as an Invar tool of the same size. Epoxy tooling prepreg is limited to a few hundred cure cycles; bismaleimide tooling prepreg survives several hundred to over a thousand cycles at 180 °C and above. Hybrid constructions put a composite or thin Invar facesheet over a carbon-foam or composite backing structure to combine a durable surface with low weight; one such tail-cone mandrel is reported at about 3,000 lb, roughly a third of the Invar equivalent. Machined monolithic graphite is used as a master tool from which bismaleimide working tools are taken; Northrop Grumman has described using this combination for its F-35 composite parts. Nickel shells formed by vapour deposition and machinable tooling boards are also used, the latter mainly for prototypes and low-temperature parts.

Tools have also been made by large-scale additive manufacturing. In 2016 Oak Ridge National Laboratory printed a 17.5-foot trim-and-drill tool for the Boeing 777X wing skin from carbon-fiber-reinforced ABS in 30 hours; Guinness World Records certified it as the largest solid 3D-printed object, and Boeing said the equivalent metal tool from a supplier typically took three months.

== Mandrels ==
Hollow parts such as ducts and one-piece fuselage barrels are laid up on a mandrel that must be removed after cure. For a full-barrel fuselage the mandrel is built in segments that bolt together for layup and retract after cure to free the part. A 4.5 m by 2 m carbon-fiber mandrel of this kind was built for the European FUBACOMP full-barrel business-jet fuselage demonstrator. The Invar mandrels for the Boeing 787's one-piece fuselage barrels are far heavier still.

== See also ==
- Automated fiber placement
- Autoclave
- Pre-preg
- Invar
- Mandrel
- Aerostructure
