= Boeing Dreamlifter =

Outsize cargo conversion of the 747-400

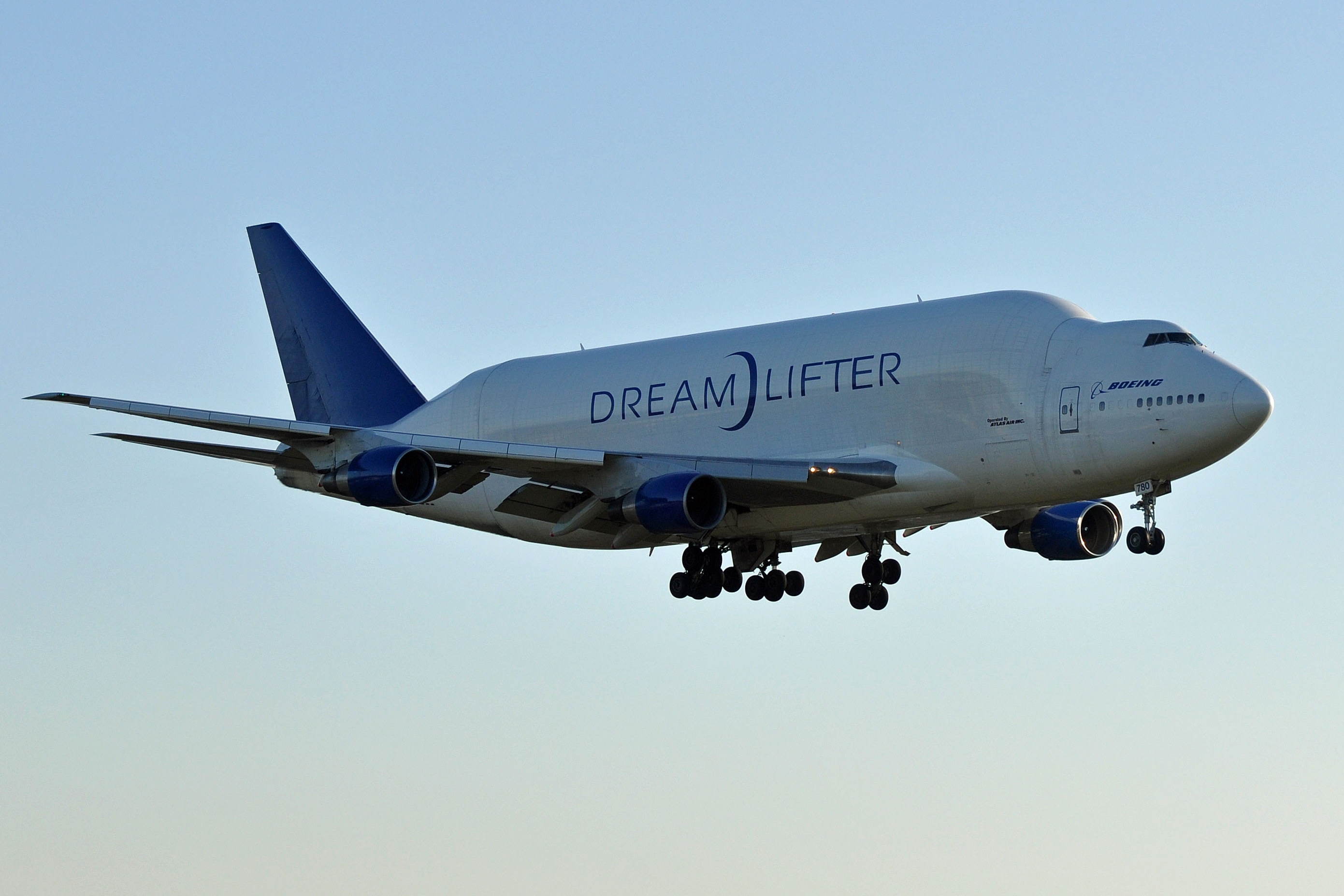
- Boeing 747-400 LCF Dreamlifter

General information
- Type: Boeing 747-400 LCF
- Manufacturer: Boeing Commercial Airplanes; Evergreen Aviation Technologies Corporation
- Status: In service
- Primary user: Atlas Air under contract with Boeing
- Number built: 4 (all converted aircraft)
- Registration: N249BA; N718BA; N747BC; N780BA

History
- Introduction date: 2007
- First flight: September 9, 2006
- Developed from: Boeing 747-400

The Boeing Dreamlifter, officially the 747-400 Large Cargo Freighter (LCF), is an American wide-body cargo aircraft modified extensively from the Boeing 747-400 airliner. With a volume of 65,000 cubic feet (1,840 m^{3}) it has three times the volume of a 747-400F freighter. The outsized aircraft was designed to transport Boeing 787 Dreamliner parts between Italy, Japan, and the US, a role from which the name Dreamlifter is derived. It has also flown medical supplies during the COVID-19 pandemic.

== Development ==
The 1960s Apollo program, in need to transport rocket sections with low weight but large diameter, had used enlarged bulging fuselage airplanes like the Super Guppy which in the 1970s were adopted by Airbus, a consortium based in several European countries that needs to transport wings and wide-body aircraft fuselage sections. Since 1994, a fleet of Airbus Beluga, later upgraded to BelugaXL, with lowered cockpit section and Beluga whale paint scheme, is in use.

Boeing Commercial Airplanes announced on October 13, 2003, that, due to the length of time required by land and marine shipping, air transport would be the main method of transporting parts for the assembly of the Boeing 787 (then known as the 7E7). Boeing 787 parts were deemed too large for standard marine shipping containers as well as the Boeing 747-400F, Antonov An-124 and An-225.

Initially, three used passenger 747-400 aircraft were to be converted into an outsize Large Cargo Freighter configuration in order to ferry sub-assemblies from Japan and Italy to North Charleston, South Carolina, and then to Washington state for final assembly, but a fourth was subsequently added to the program.

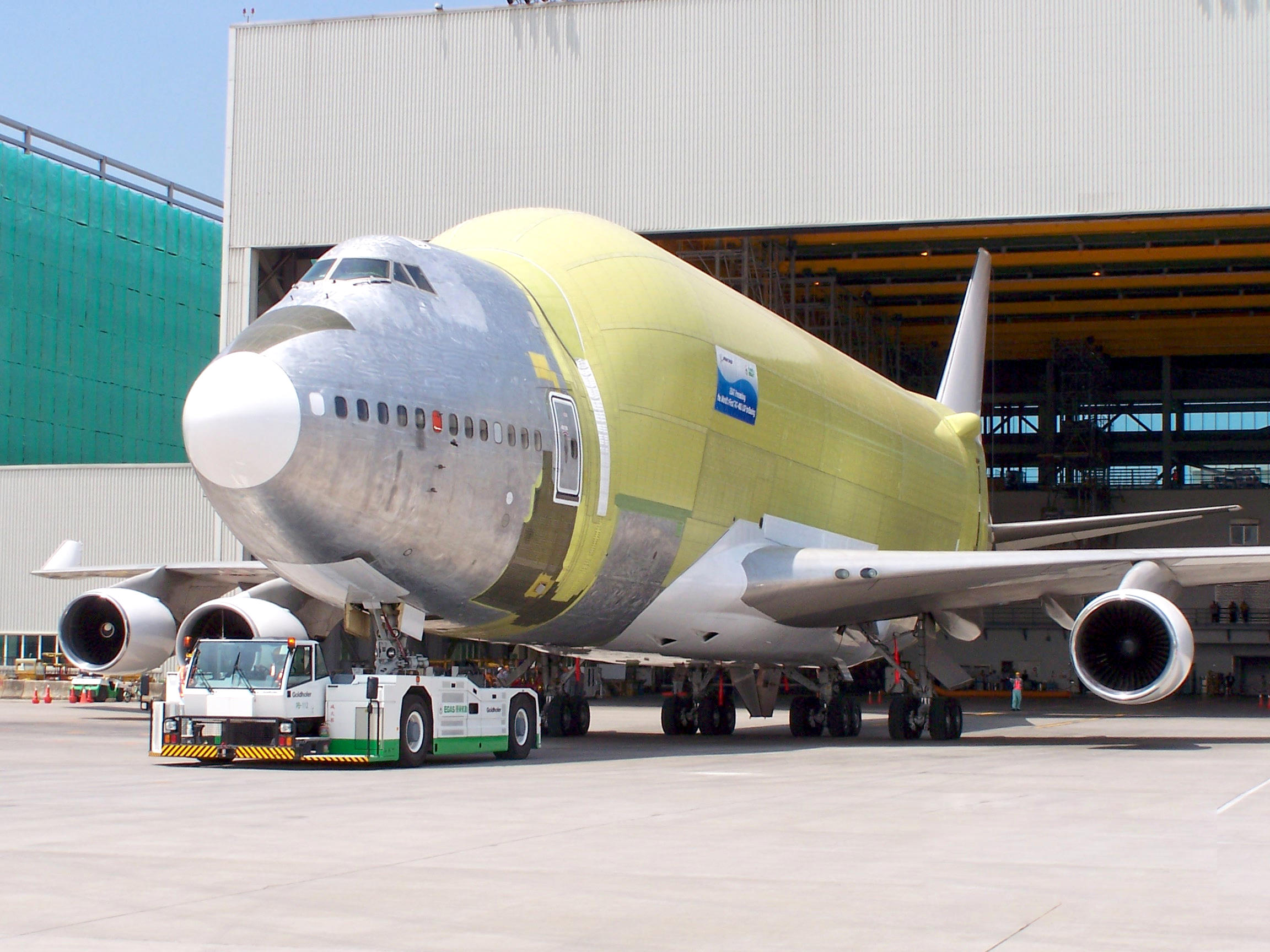
The first aircraft to be converted, N747BC, in 2006

The LCF conversion was partially designed by Boeing's Moscow bureau and Boeing Rocketdyne with the swing tail designed in partnership with Gamesa Aeronáutica of Spain. The cargo portion of the aircraft is unpressurized. Unlike the hydraulically supported nose section on a 747 Freighter, the tail is opened and closed by a modified shipping container handling truck, and locked to the rear fuselage with 21 electronic actuators.

Modifications were carried out in Taiwan by Evergreen Aviation Technologies Corporation, a joint venture of Evergreen Group's EVA Air and General Electric. Boeing reacquired the four 747-400s; one former Air China aircraft, two former China Airlines aircraft, and one former Malaysia Airlines aircraft.

The first 747 Large Cargo Freighter (LCF) was rolled out of the hangar at Taipei Taoyuan International Airport on August 17, 2006. It successfully completed its first test flight on September 9, 2006, from this airport.

The 787 Dreamliner parts are placed in the aircraft by the DBL-100 cargo loader, the world's longest cargo loader. In June 2006, the first DBL-100 cargo loader was completed.

The 747 LCF's unusual appearance has drawn comparisons to the Oscar Mayer Wienermobile and the Hughes H-4 Hercules ("Spruce Goose"). Due to its ungainly form—exacerbated in that the first airplane remained unpainted for some time, due to the need for immediate testing—Boeing Commercial Airplanes president Scott Carson jokingly apologized to 747 designer Joe Sutter that he was "sorry for what we did to your plane."

== Operational history ==
=== Flight testing ===
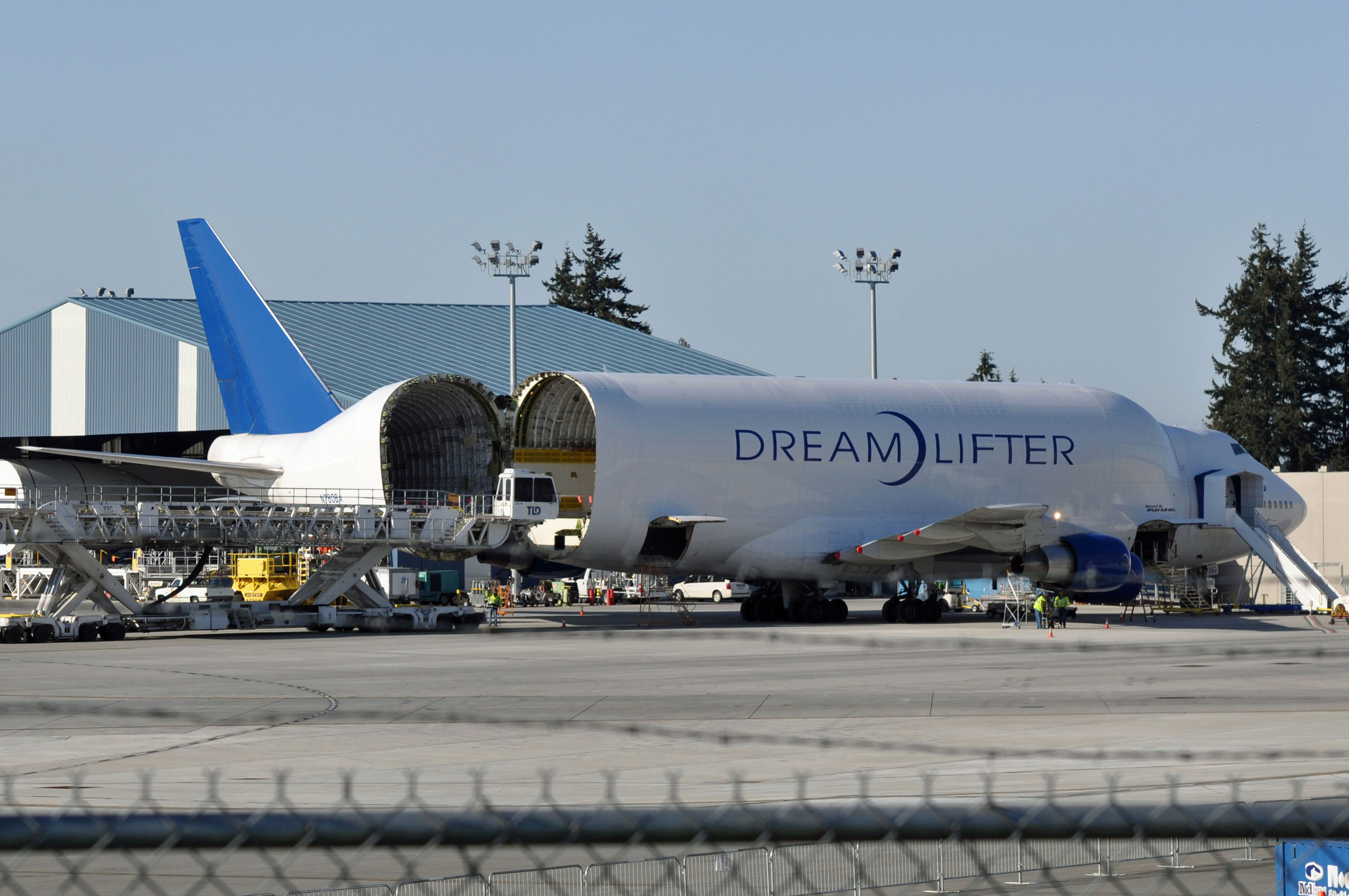
Boeing 747 LCF with its swing-tail open

On September 16, 2006, N747BC arrived at Boeing Field, Seattle to complete the flight test program. Swing-tail testing was done at the Boeing factory in Everett. The second airplane, N780BA, made its inaugural test flight on February 16, 2007. The third began modification in 2007. The first two LCFs entered service in 2007 to support the final assembly of the first 787s. Another 747-400 came from Malaysia Airlines, originally registered as 9M-MPA, before becoming N718BA.

Delivery times for the 787's wings, built in Japan, was reduced from around 30 days to just over eight hours with the Dreamlifter. Evergreen International Airlines (unrelated to EVA Air or EGAT), a US air freight operator based in McMinnville, Oregon, operated the LCF fleet until August 2010. Then Atlas Air, which was awarded a nine-year contract for the operation of the aircraft in March 2010, took over LCF operation. Evergreen had achieved a 93% on flight schedule performance with the LCF, and sued Boeing for $175 million, which the court mostly dismissed.

=== Into service ===
In December 2006, Boeing announced the 747 LCF would be named Dreamlifter, a reference to the 787's name, Dreamliner. It unveiled a standard livery for the aircraft that included a logo reminiscent of the 787's Dreamliner logo.

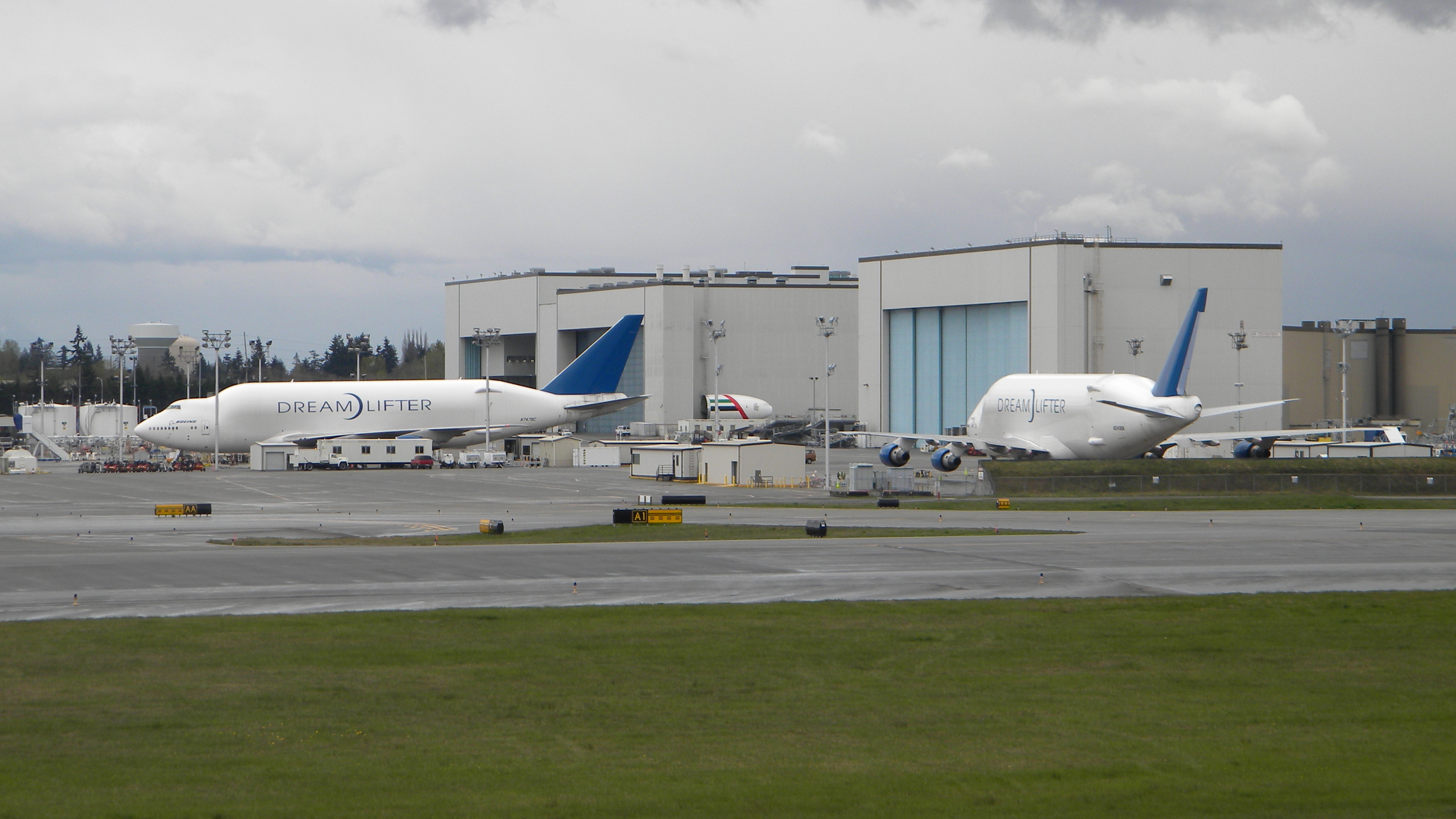
Two Dreamlifters at the Boeing Everett Factory in Paine Field

Certification was initially planned for early 2007, but was pushed back to June 2007. The aircraft's winglets were removed to resolve excess vibration and other handling characteristics prior to final certification. In the meantime, as part of the flight test program, LCF delivered major sections of the 787 from partner sites around the world to the Boeing factory in Everett, Washington for final assembly. The 747 LCF was granted FAA type certification on June 2, 2007. From its first flight in 2006 until certification in 2007, the Dreamlifter completed 437 hours of flight testing along with 639 hours of ground testing.

Of the four 747 Dreamlifters Boeing acquired, three were complete and operational by June 2008, and the fourth became operational in February 2010.

On July 1, 2020, a Dreamlifter arrived at Salt Lake City International Airport, carrying 500,000 face masks to be used by Utah school children and teachers as part of the state's response to the COVID-19 pandemic. The flight was a joint effort between Boeing, Atlas Air, H.M. Cole, Cotopaxi, Flexport, UPS and the state of Utah.

== Incidents ==
On November 20, 2013, Dreamlifter N780BA operated by Atlas Air inadvertently landed at Colonel James Jabara Airport, a small general aviation airport in Wichita, Kansas. Its intended destination was McConnell Air Force Base, 9 miles (14 km) past Jabara Airport on the same heading. The aircraft was able to successfully take off again from Jabara's 6,101-foot (1,860 m) runway the following day and landed at McConnell without incident.

On October 11, 2022, Dreamlifter N718BA operated by Atlas Air lost a wheel from its main landing gear while taking off from Taranto, Italy. The wheel bounced outside the airport perimeter and ended up in a vineyard. The plane continued on to North Charleston, South Carolina (CHS) and made a safe landing.

== Specifications ==
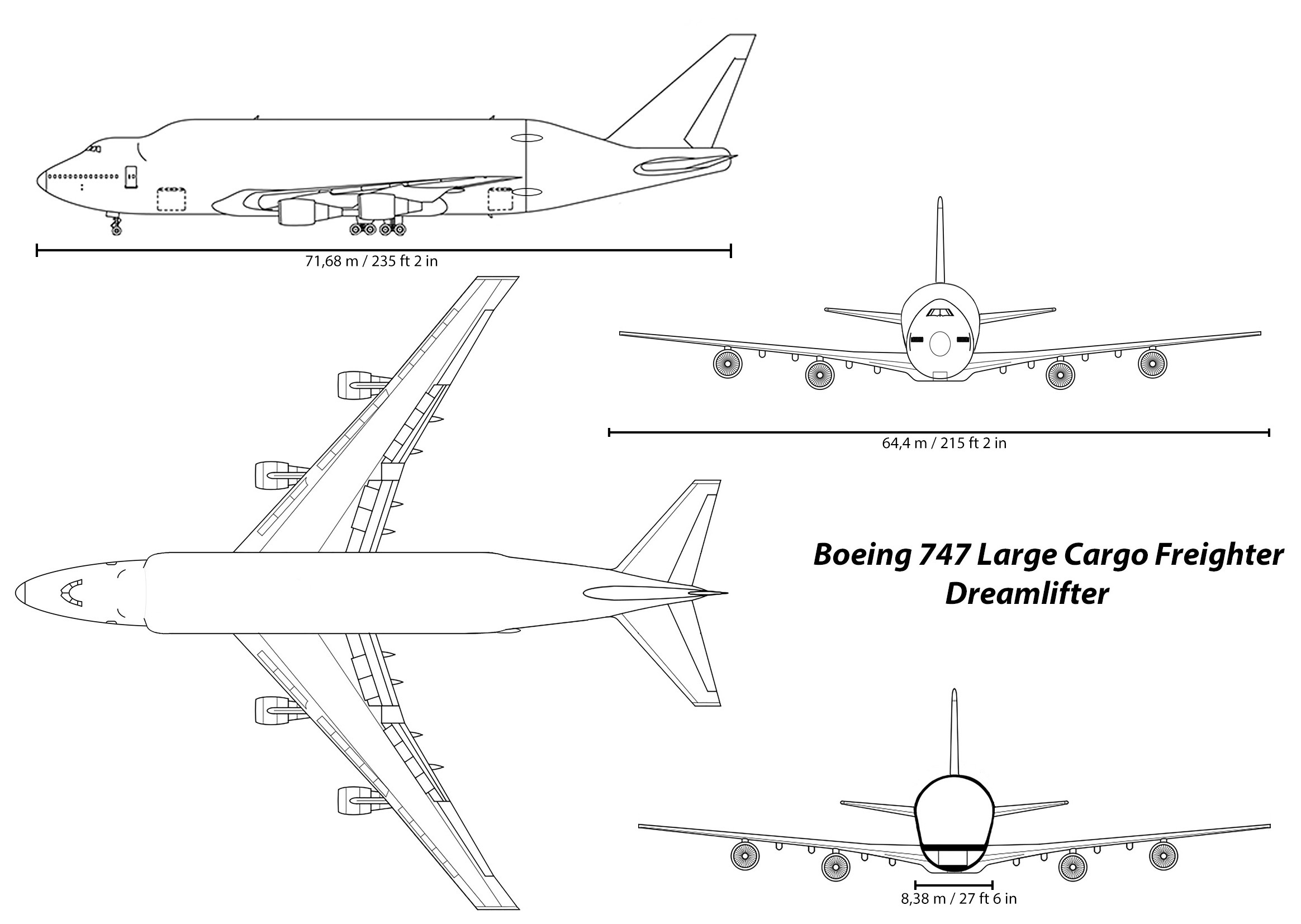
Dreamlifter's perspective tables

The 747 LCF main cargo compartment has a volume of 65,000 cubic feet (1,840 m^{3}) and the maximum payload capacity is 250,000 pounds (113,400 kg).

Model	747 Dreamlifter	747-400
Cockpit crew	Two	
Length	235 ft 2 in (71.68 m)	231 ft 10 in (70.7 m)
Wingspan	211 ft 5 in (64.44 m)	
Height	70 ft 8 in (21.54 m)	63 ft 8 in (19.4 m)
Fuselage width	27 ft 6 in (8.38 m)	21 ft 4 in (6.50 m)
Spec Operating Empty Weight	180,530 kg (398,000 lb)	179,015 kg (394,661 lb)
Maximum take-off weight	364,235 kg (803,001 lb)	396,890 kg (874,990 lb)
Cruising speed	Mach 0.82 (471 kn; 872 km/h; 542 mph)	Mach 0.855 (491 kn; 910 km/h; 565 mph)
Takeoff run at MTOW	9,199 ft (2,804 m)	9,902 ft (3,018 m)
Range fully loaded	4,200 nmi (7,800 km; 4,800 mi)	7,260 nmi (13,450 km; 8,350 mi)
Max. fuel capacity	52,609 US gal (199,150 L; 43,806 imp gal)	57,285 US gal (216,850 L; 47,700 imp gal)
Engine models (×4)	PW 4056	PW 4056; GE CF6-80C2B5F; RR RB211-524G/H
Engine thrust (per engine)	63,300 lbf (282 kN)	PW: 63,300 lbf (282 kN); GE: 62,100 lbf (276 kN); RR: 59,500 lbf (265 kN)
Sources: Boeing 747-400 specifications, Boeing 747 Airport Report, 747 LCF fact sheet

== See also ==
Related development

- Boeing 747-400 – Wide-body airliner, improved production series of the 747
- Boeing 787 Dreamliner – Twin-aisle airliner family

Aircraft of comparable role, configuration, and era

- Aero Spacelines Pregnant Guppy – Outsize cargo conversion of the Boeing 377 Stratocruiser
- Aero Spacelines Super Guppy – Larger turboprop version of outsize cargo aircraft Pregnant Guppy
- Airbus A300-600ST Beluga – Outsize cargo version of the A300-600 airliner
- Airbus A330-743L BelugaXL – 2020 large cargo aircraft
- Antonov An-225 Mriya – Soviet/Ukrainian heavy strategic cargo aircraft
- Conroy CL-44-0 Skymonster – Canadian cargo airliner conversion with 4 turboprop engines, 1969—Outsize cargo version of the Canadair CL-44
