= Samuel Ducommun =

Swiss composer and organist

Samuel Ducommun (21 June 1914 - 6 August 1987) was a Swiss composer and organist. Ducommon's models included Arthur Honegger and Marcel Dupré.

== Works ==
Ducommun's catalog comprises around a hundred works. The 1958 oratorio La Moisson de Feu, to lyrics by Marc Eigeldinger was premiered posthumously in Neuchâtel in March 2019.

== Selected recordings ==
Samuel Ducommun: La Moisson de Feu, oratorio after the Book of Revelation Op.63a - Choeurs et orchestre de la HEM Genève-Neuchâtel, Choeur d’enfants de l’Institut Jaques-Dalcroze, Genève, P'tit Chœur au Grand Coeur du Conservatoire de musique neuchâtelois conductor Nicolas Farine. Claves 2020
