= Ducommun =

American manufacturer

Ducommun Incorporated
- Traded as: NYSE: DCO; Russell 2000 Component
- Industry: Aerospace & Defense
- Founded: 1849
- Headquarters: Costa Mesa, California, USA
- Number of locations: 15 Manufacturing Performance Centers
- Key people: Chairman, President & CEO: Stephen G. Oswald
- Products: Structural Solutions, Electronic Systems, Engineered Products, Aftermarket Services
- Services: Engineering, Design, Manufacturing
- Number of employees: 2,500
- Website: ducommun.com

Ducommun Incorporated (NYSE: DCO) is a global provider of manufacturing and engineering services, developing electronic, engineered and structural solutions for applications in aerospace, defense and industrial markets.

Founded in 1849, Ducommun is recognized as the oldest continuously operating business in California and today manufactures structural and electronic components, sub-assemblies and engineered products for a wide range of commercial, military and space platforms including Boeing 737 and 787, Airbus A320 and Airbus A220, Joint Strike Fighter (JSF) and F/A-18 fighter jets, C-17 heavy lift cargo jet, the Apache, Chinook and Black Hawk helicopters, as well as other key missile and defense programs.

Ducommun's approximately 2,500 employees work at its 15 performance centers located in California, Arkansas, Kansas, Oklahoma, Missouri, New York, Rhode Island, Wisconsin, Washington, and Guaymas, Mexico. Ducommun’s corporate headquarters is based out of Costa Mesa, California.

== History ==
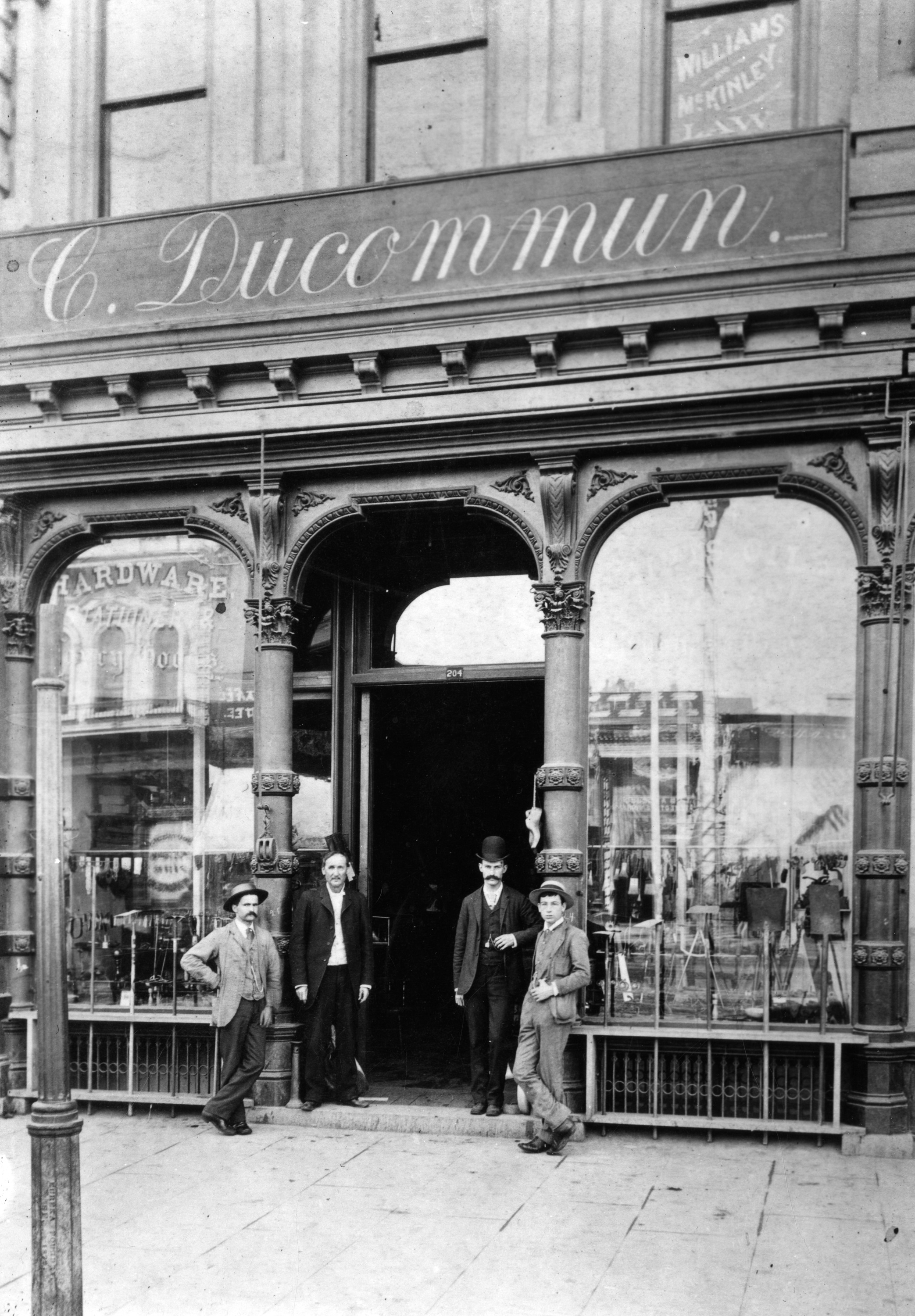
Facade of Charles Louis Ducommun's hardware store on Main Street in Los Angeles, 1886. From Left: Employee Henry Balsinger, owner Charles Louis Ducommun, employee Henry Vanderleck, and son (and employee) Charles Albert Ducommun

Ducommun was established in 1849 by Charles Louis Ducommun who was born in France and moved to Switzerland, where he and his 12 siblings were raised. A watchmaker by trade, Charles emigrated to the United States in the early 1840s, and opened a watchmaking business in New York City. To escape the populated city, he moved his business south and eventually embarked on a grueling journey from Fort Smith Arkansas, along the Santa Fe Trail, to California, lured by the discovery of gold in the area. Charles traveled on foot for the nine-month journey encountering harsh weather, starvation, illness and other threats. Charles arrived in Los Angeles in 1849 and opened a watch store. Over the next several decades, the business became a general store for miners and ranchers, then a hardware store catering to Los Angeles’s many growth industries including construction and oil exploration.

In 1896, Charles L. Ducommun died at the age of 76, leaving the business to his four sons, Charles Albert, Alfred, Emil, and Edmond. Under their leadership, the business was incorporated as Ducommun Hardware Company and primarily served as a metals distributor. Most notably, Ducommun backed early aircraft designer Donald Douglas with a line of credit, supplying metals and tools to the aviation industry, which was then in its infancy. During World War I, Ducommun was able to significantly expand its metals supply business, feeding copper, brass and steel to the emerging defense industry for shipbuilding and munitions.

In 1942, Ducommun again rebranded and became known as Ducommun Metals & Supply Co. When the United States entered World War II, Ducommun’s large inventory of stainless steel and carbon steel fed the production of bomber and fighter aircraft as well as military ships that were used in both the European and Pacific theaters. By 1949, Ducommun was recognized as the leading metal materials distributor in the West. Over the next 15 years, Ducommun diversified to support the needs of an aircraft industry that was rapidly incorporating more electronic components. The 1980s were years of restructuring and change for Ducommun and the industry overall. Both the metals and electronics distribution businesses were sold as the Company reoriented itself to become a member of the aerospace industry supply chain. Over the following decades, Ducommun’s growth was fueled by major contract wins with McDonnell-Douglas, Boeing, and key space platforms.

In 2017, Stephen G. Oswald was named President and CEO of Ducommun, and was appointed Chairman of the Board in 2018. Oswald immediately streamlined the organization, sharpening Ducommun’s strategic focus on A&D. The Company began its expansion into aftermarket products and services through five strategic acquisitions in Oswald’s first five years with the organization.

== Recognition ==
Ducommun is a two-time recipient of Newsweek's 2024/2025 Most Responsible Companies and has been named by TIME Magazine as one of America's Best Mid-Sized Companies in 2025.
