= Automated fiber placement =

Automated method of manufacturing composite materials

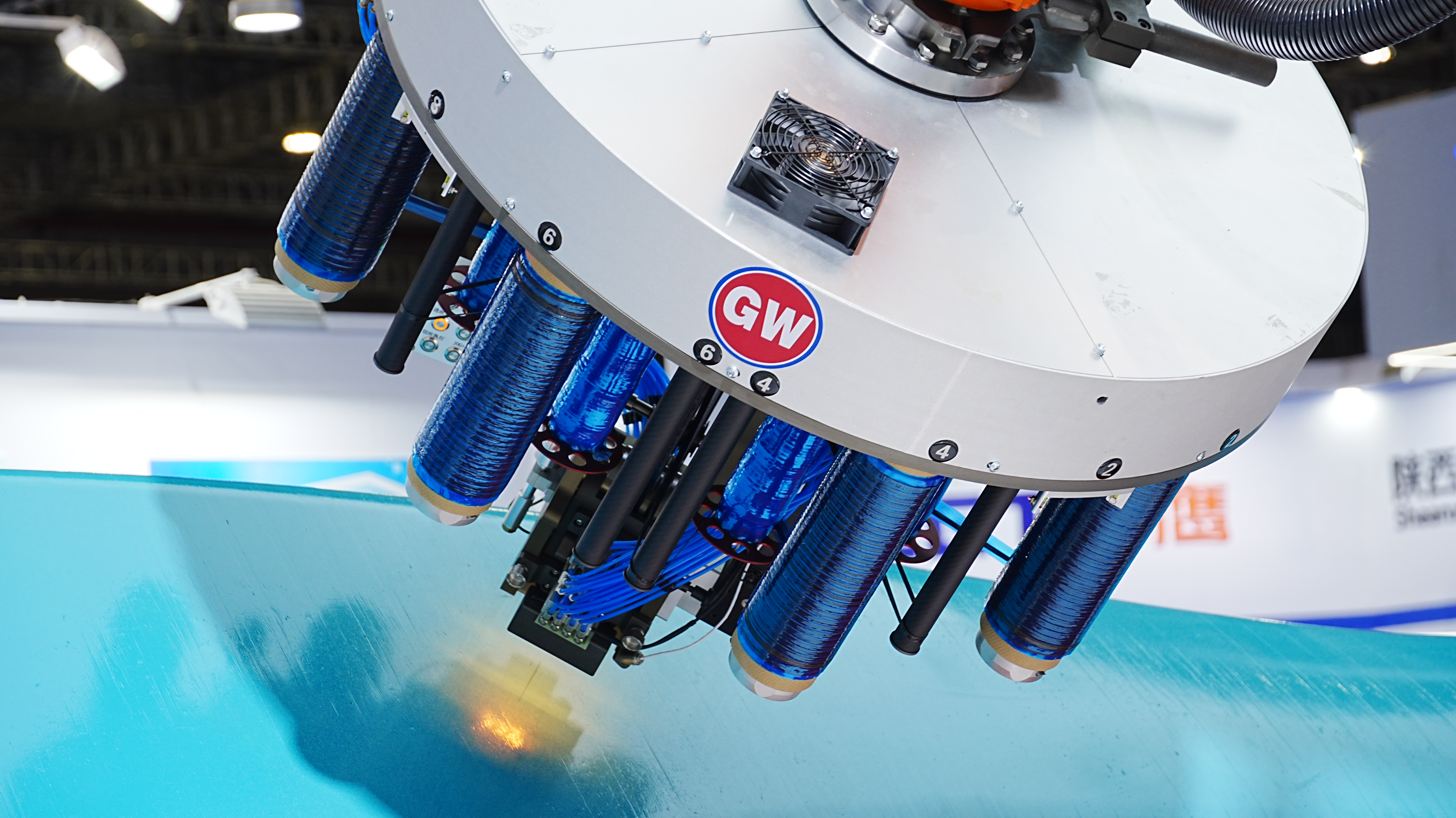
An automated fiber placement machine laying thermoset prepreg tows

Automated fiber placement (AFP), also known as advanced fiber placement, is an automated process for manufacturing composite material parts in which narrow strips of pre-impregnated fiber are laid onto a tool by a machine head. It is used for airframe structures and other industrial products where composites replace metals for their lower weight at equal or greater strength.

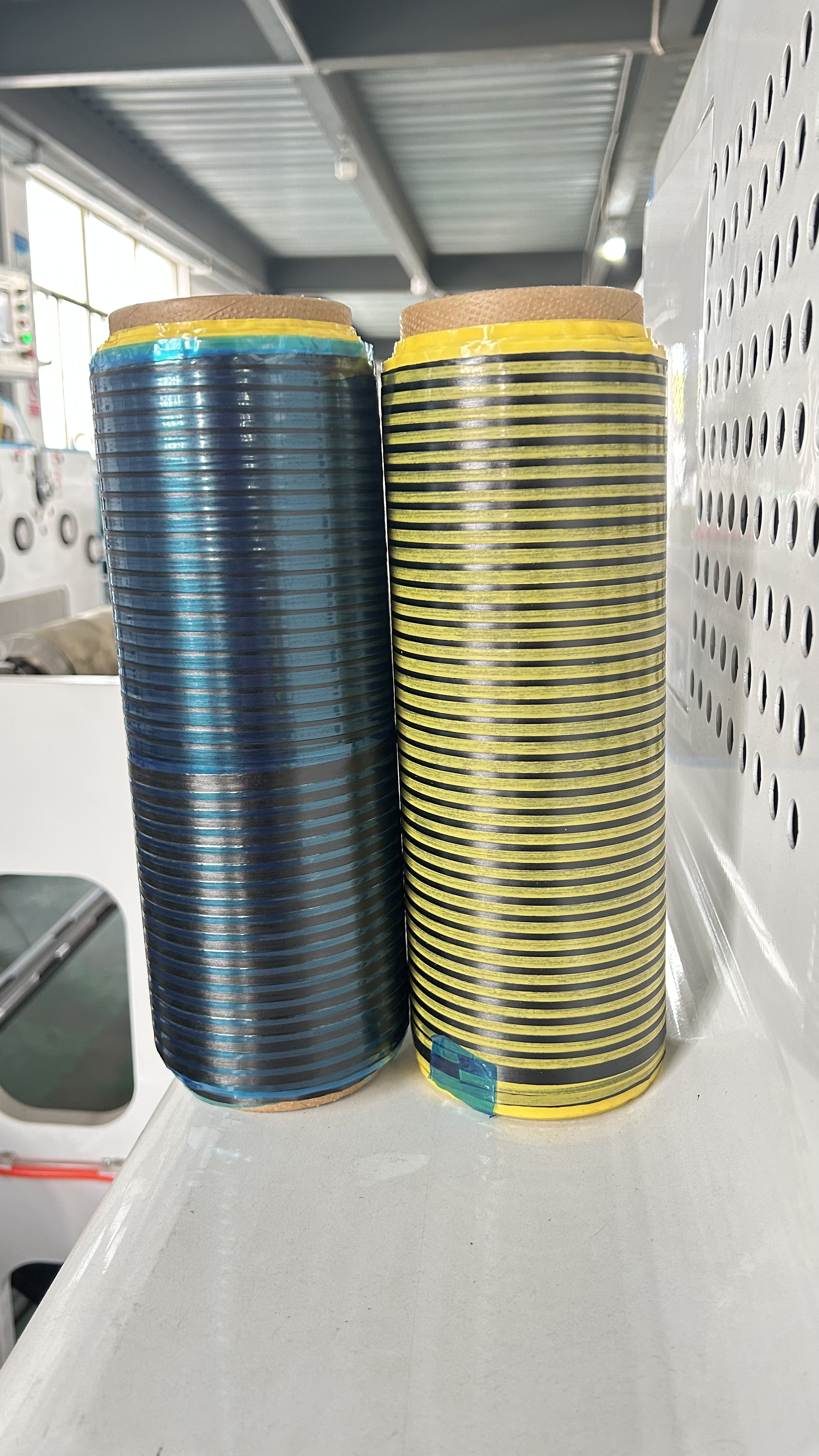
Carbon-fiber prepreg tows loaded on an AFP head

Fiber placement is an automated composites manufacturing process of heating and compacting synthetic resin pre-impregnated non-metallic fibers on typically complex tooling mandrels. The fiber usually comes in the form of what are referred to as "tows". A tow is typically a bundle of carbon fibers impregnated with epoxy resin and is approximately 0.500 inches (12.7 mm) wide by 0.005 inches (0.13 mm) thick and comes on a spool. Fiber placement machines (FPM) generally have a capacity of 12 to 32 tows or when placing all tows at a time in a course, have respective course widths of 1.5 in to 4 in. The tows are fed to a heater and compaction roller on the FPM head and through robotic type machine movements, are placed in courses across a tool surface. Courses are generally placed in orientations of 0°, +45°, -45° and 90° to build up plies which in combination, have good properties in all directions. Fiber placement machines are generally rated in (lb/h), (lb/min) or weight per time.

== Description ==
Automated fiber placement (AFP) machines are a recent development of composite manufacturing technologies meant to increase rate and precision in the production of advanced composite parts. AFP machines place fiber reinforcements on moulds or mandrels in an automatic fashion and use a number of separate small width tows (typically 8 millimetres (0.31 in) or less) of thermoset or thermoplastic pre-impregnated materials to form composite layups. This technology allows better precision and increased deposition rates when compared with experienced laminators but, while allowing for more complex layup geometries than Automated Tape Laying (ATL) it does not reach the same deposition rates. Automated fiber placement can be used to manufacture complex structures that are not possible to manufacture with any other methods.

== History ==
Fiber placement grew out of filament winding. Hercules Aerospace in Utah, whose filament-winding work dated to 1957, began developing what it first called "six-axis filament winding" in 1980 and assembled its first machine in 1983. Its delivery head laid 12 tows, and the machine was used, together with conventional winding, to make the tailcone of the Sikorsky S-75 ACAP helicopter. A later Hercules machine laid the aft fuselage of the Bell Boeing V-22 Osprey, and under NASA's Advanced Composites Technology program in the early 1990s the company placed curved fuselage crown panels up to 7 by 10 feet for Boeing and Douglas to demonstrate the process for commercial transports.

Commercial fiber placement machines became available in the late 1980s from Cincinnati Milacron (later MAG and Fives) and Ingersoll. By the mid-1990s the process was in limited production, almost entirely on military programs such as the F-22 and V-22. With the Boeing 787, whose one-piece fuselage barrels are laid by fiber placement, the process entered commercial airliner production.

== Comparison with automated tape laying ==
Automated tape laying (ATL), the older of the two processes, lays unidirectional prepreg tape 75, 150 or 300 mm wide and suits flat or gently curved parts such as wing skins and tailplanes. Fiber placement uses many narrow tows, typically 3.2, 6.4 or 12.7 mm (⅛, ¼ or ½ inch) wide, delivered through a single head that can cut, clamp and restart each tow independently. Because each tow can follow its own path, the head can steer around curvature and place material on compound-curved tools. The cost is a lower deposition rate: on a complex fuselage section the rate is roughly half that of ATL on a flat laminate. Machines handle up to 32 tows at once; Electroimpact's system lays material at up to 2,000 inches per minute, with tow cuts timed to less than a millisecond.

== Defects and inspection ==
Fiber placement has its own class of layup defects. Steering tows around curves can produce buckled or twisted tows and gaps or overlaps between neighbouring tows, and tows that are cut and restarted at ply boundaries leave small gaps or overlaps of their own. Other defects include unintended tow drops, puckered tows, foreign objects and loose fiber "fuzzballs". The laminate is inspected ply by ply as it is laid. In-process inspection systems scan each course with a laser profilometer and flag gaps, overlaps, and tow adds and drops automatically.

== Applications ==
Fiber placement is used for the fuselages of commercial airliners. For the Boeing 787, Spirit AeroSystems lays the Section 41 nose on Electroimpact machines, Kawasaki Heavy Industries lays its forward section on an MTorres machine, and other barrel sections are laid on Viper machines. The Airbus A350 uses fiber placement differently, laying its fuselage skin as large curved panels; the centre-fuselage panels built at Kinston, North Carolina are laid on an Electroimpact machine and shipped to Saint-Nazaire, France for assembly. The fuselages of the Hawker 4000 and Beechcraft Premier I business jets are built as fiber-placed barrels.

Military applications include the F-22 air-inlet duct, the 35-foot upper wing skins of the F-35, and the V-22 aft fuselage. Fiber placement is also used for wing spars, where the head steers tows around the spar flanges. In 2015 NASA Langley commissioned ISAAC, a 16-tow fiber placement robot built by Electroimpact on a KUKA industrial arm, as a research testbed for aircraft and spacecraft structures.

== Equipment ==
Fiber placement machines take two forms. Cincinnati/MAG (now Fives), Ingersoll, MTorres and Electroimpact build large gantry or column machines derived from CNC machine tools; Coriolis Composites, and Electroimpact for research systems, mount a fiber placement head on a standard industrial robot arm. Heads are rated by the number of tows they carry, usually 12 to 32, and by deposition rate in kilograms or pounds per hour.

== See also ==
- Composite material
- Composite tooling
- Filament winding
- Pre-preg
- Autoclave
- Tailored fiber placement
