= Pan Am Flight 202 =

1952 aviation accident

Pan American World Airways Flight 202
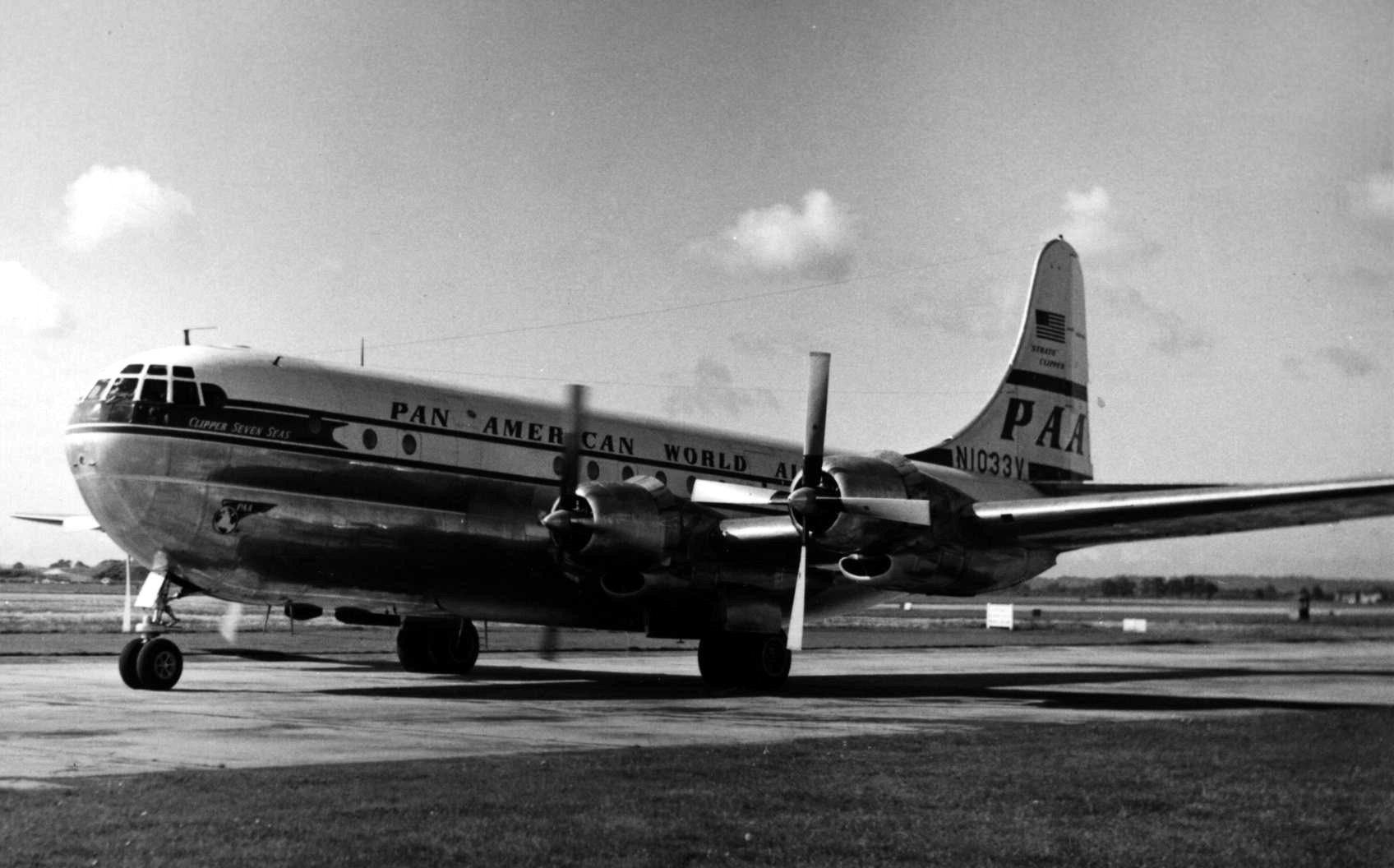
- A Boeing 377 Stratocruiser operated by Pan American World Airways, similar to the aircraft lost in the accident.

Accident
- Date: April 29, 1952
- Summary: Engine separation, in-flight breakup
- Site: 281 nautical miles (520 km) SW of Carolina, Brazil; 9°45′36″S 50°47′18″W

Aircraft
- Aircraft type: Boeing 377; Stratocruiser 10-26
- Aircraft name: Clipper Good Hope
- Operator: Pan American World Airways
- Call sign: CLIPPER 202
- Registration: N1039V
- Flight origin: Buenos Aires, Argentina
- 1st stopover: Montevideo, Uruguay
- 2nd stopover: Rio de Janeiro–Galeão International Airport, Brazil
- 3rd stopover: Port of Spain-Piarco Airport, Trinidad and Tobago
- Destination: Idlewild Airport (now John F. Kennedy International Airport), New York City, United States
- Occupants: 50
- Passengers: 41
- Crew: 9
- Fatalities: 50
- Survivors: 0

Pan American World Airways Flight 202 was a Boeing 377 Stratocruiser aircraft that crashed in the Amazon Basin about 281 nautical miles (320 mi; 520 km) southwest of Carolina, Brazil, on April 29, 1952. The accident happened en route from Rio de Janeiro, Brazil, to Port of Spain, Trinidad and Tobago, during the third leg of a four-leg journey. All 50 people on board were killed in the deadliest-ever accident involving the Boeing 377.

The investigation took place under exceptionally unfavorable conditions, and the exact cause of the crash was not established. However, it was theorized based on an examination of the wreckage that an engine had separated in flight after propeller blade failure.

== Aircraft ==
The Boeing 377 Stratocruiser registration N1039V, christened Clipper Good Hope, made its first flight on September 28, 1949. At the time of the accident, it had accumulated a total of 6,944 airframe hours in flight. It was equipped with four 28-cylinder Pratt & Whitney R-4360 Wasp Major radial piston engines, each with a Hamilton Standard Model 24260 four-blade propeller. The propeller blades were constructed with a rubber core filling a steel shell, which was later identified as a design prone to structural failure.

== Flight and disappearance ==
Flight 202 was an international scheduled passenger flight from Buenos Aires, Argentina, to New York City, New York, with three en route stops scheduled at Montevideo, Uruguay; Rio de Janeiro, Brazil; and Port of Spain, Trinidad and Tobago. It began its route on the evening of April 28, 1952, in Buenos Aires, and after stopping off in Montevideo, it arrived in Rio de Janeiro at 1:05 a.m. local time (04:05 UTC) on April 29. It departed Rio less than two hours later, at 2:43 a.m. (05:43 UTC), heading for Port of Spain on the third leg of its journey. It was cleared to fly an off-airways route directly to Port of Spain, which took it over the dense forests of the Amazon jungle.

The flight reported abeam the city of Barreiras in eastern Brazil at 6:16 a.m. local time (09:16 UTC), flying at 14,500 feet (4,400 m) under VFR conditions; the pilots estimated that the next position report would be at 7:45 a.m. (10:45 UTC), abeam the city of Carolina in the northeastern state of Maranhão, Brazil. This was the last known message from the flight. Witnesses in the villages of Formosa and São Francisco reported seeing the aircraft overhead at about the time it reported abeam Barreiras; they described the aircraft as operating normally.

When the aircraft failed to report abeam Carolina and then abeam the city of Santarém in northern Brazil, local authorities initiated a missing aircraft alert.

== Search and discovery ==
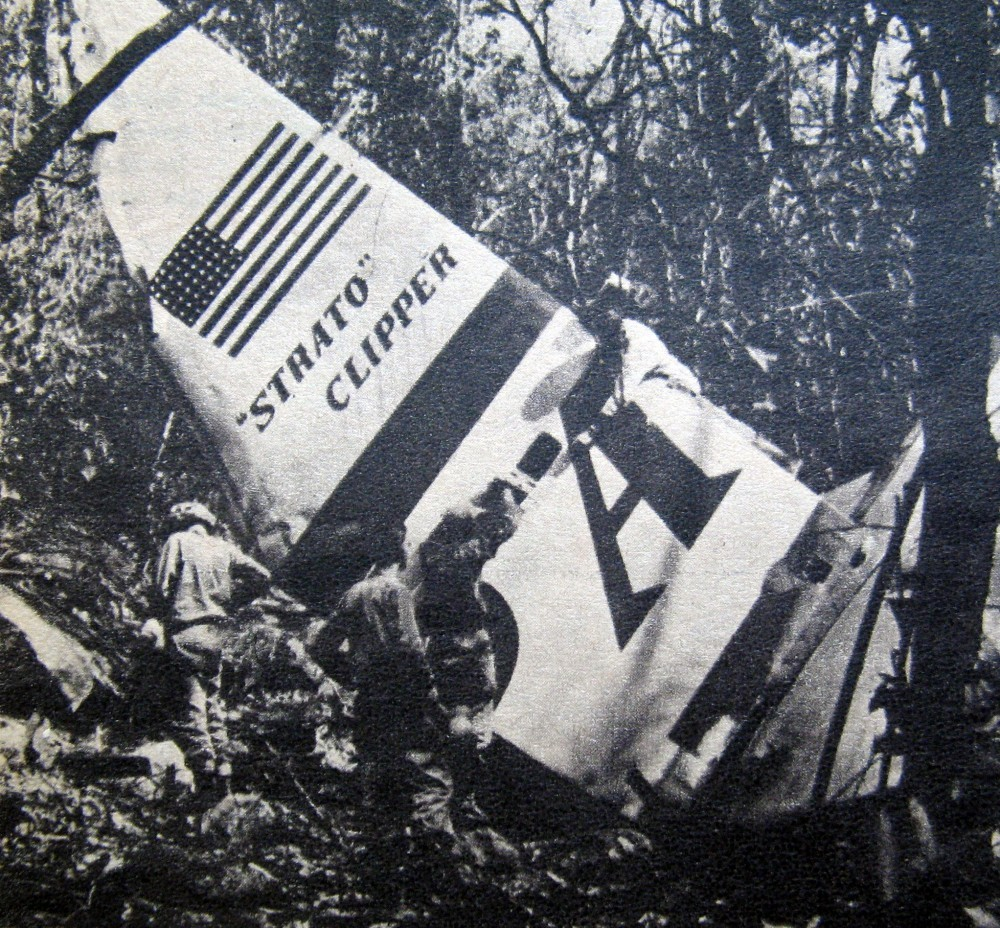
The wreckage of Pan American Flight 202

Brazilian Air Force, United States Air Force, and United States Navy aircraft searched the jungle, while Brazilian Navy ships searched the coastal areas off northern South America. The wreckage was not found until May 1, when a Pan American Curtiss Commando freighter reported finding it in Caraja Indian territory 281 nautical miles (520 km) southwest of Carolina.

"The burned, broken wreckage of the Pan American Stratocruiser that vanished Monday night was found in northern Brazil today," reported The New York Times in its May 2, 1952, issue. There was no evidence that any of the 50 people on board, including 19 Americans, lived through the crash. An air hunt over 320,000 square miles (830,000 km^{2}) of jungle, river basins and plateau land finally located the ruins in the Indian country between the cities of Barreiras and Carolina.

According to airline officials, Capt. Jim Kowing of Miami piloted a C-46 Pan American cargo plane that made the discovery. The scene is about 250 miles (220 nmi; 400 km) southwest of Carolina, a Tocantins River town 1,100 miles (960 nmi; 1,800 km) north-northwest of Rio de Janeiro. The double-decked Stratocruiser was reported to have broken in two; its charred wreckage was scattered on both sides of a 1,500-foot-high (460 m) hill.

Pan American officials said a Panair do Brasil airliner circled the scene of the crash; its pilot reported extensive evidence of fire and said he saw two of the big plane's engines lying 1,600 feet (490 m) apart in the hilly, heavily wooded area. Maj. Richard Olney of the US Air Force base in San Juan, Puerto Rico, and Maj. Oliver Seaman, an Air Force flight surgeon, oversaw the conversion of a Pan American passenger plane to carry a seven-person rescue team.

Pan American's office at Miami reported that, after circling the scene for four hours, the rescue plane returned to its base at Para without dropping the rescue team. It said they did not jump because there were no signs of survivors.

== Investigation ==
Later, a 27-man investigation team flew via seaplane to Lago Grande, a tiny Indian village on the Araguaia River less than 40 nautical miles (50 mi; 70 km) from the wreckage, with the intention of trekking to the accident site. Unfortunately, the extreme nature of the terrain forced all but seven team members to return to Lago Grande before reaching the site. The remaining seven investigators, running short of water, food and other supplies, were only able to confirm that all on board had died on impact and that a huge fire had consumed the fuselage.

A properly equipped and provisioned second investigation team built a base camp northwest of Lago Grande and finally reached the wreckage on August 15. They determined that the wreckage had fallen to the ground in three main sections. Most of the wreckage, including the fuselage, the starboard or right wing, the root of the port or left wing (including the nacelle for the No. 2 engine but not the engine itself), and the Nos. 3 and 4 engines (normally attached to the starboard wing), had fallen in an area of dense forest about 13 nautical miles (15 mi; 24 km) northwest of the base camp. The outer port wing and the No. 1 engine had fallen 765 yards (2,295 ft; 700 m) to the northwest of the main wreckage; the empennage and fractured parts of the No. 2 engine (normally attached to the port wing) had fallen roughly 1,100 yards (3,300 ft; 1,000 m) north of the main wreckage and 800 yards (2,000 ft; 700 m) northeast of the port wing.

Although the No. 2 engine and its propeller were not found, evidence on the port wing root, the No. 2 engine nacelle, the leading edge of the vertical stabilizer, and the horizontal stabilizer led investigators to believe that the engine and/or propeller had failed in flight. There had been two prior engine separation incidents with the 377 on January 24 and 25, 1950. In this case, investigators hypothesized that the propeller failure caused the engine to experience highly unbalanced loads and it eventually separated from the aircraft, precipitating an in-flight breakup. Debris from the propeller and engine may have contributed to the breakup by damaging control surfaces after being flung from the port wing during the failure.

== See also ==
- 1954 Prestwick air disaster
- Northwest Orient Airlines Flight 2
- Pan Am Flight 6
- Pan Am Flight 7
- Pan Am Flight 845/26
