= Crash Landing (1958 film) =

1958 film

- Theatrical poster
- Directed by: Fred F. Sears
- Written by: Fred Freiberger
- Produced by: Sam Katzman
- Starring: Gary Merrill; Nancy Davis; Irene Hervey
- Narrated by: Fred F. Sears (uncredited)
- Cinematography: Benjamin H. Kline, A.S.C.
- Edited by: Jerome Thoms, A.C.E.
- Music by: Mischa Bakaleinikoff (music conducted by)
- Production company: A Clover Production
- Distributed by: Columbia Pictures Corporation
- Release date: July 1, 1958
- Running time: 76 min.
- Country: United States
- Language: English

Crash Landing (aka Rescue at Sea) is a 1958 American dramatic disaster film directed by Fred F. Sears starring Gary Merrill and Nancy Davis.

This was the last film in which Nancy Reagan (billed as Nancy Davis) appeared, though she continued to work in television for some years thereafter. It was one of the last films of director Fred Sears who died of a heart attack after filming completed.

Crash Landing was based on Pan Am Flight 6, a real-life ditching at sea. (Note: Pan Am Flight 6 was an around-the-world airline flight that ditched in the Pacific Ocean on October 16, 1956 after two of the four engines on the Boeing 377 Stratocruiser ("Clipper Sovereign of the Skies") failed.)

== Opening narration by Fred F. Sears ==
"This is Transatlantic Flight Six-Two-Seven. Flight of origination Lisbon, Portugal... destination New York, USA. Crew... six, including two stewardesses. Passengers... twenty-five... ten first class... fifteen tourist. Men fifteen... women eight... one little boy and an infant. In command... Captain Steven Williams... hours in the air... fifteen thousand four hundred and twenty-one, engineer... Howard Whitney, co-pilot... John Smithback, navigator... Jed Sutton. Between eternity and the thirty-one persons aboard... a one-inch envelope of metal and four man-made engines."

== Plot ==
Captain Steve Williams is piloting Transatlantic Flight 627, a DC-7C commercial airliner, on a flight from Lisbon to New York when two engines fail. One of the propellers cannot be feathered, causing drag that makes it uncertain whether New York can be reached. The crippled aircraft is not the only concern for Williams, as he is at odds with his wife Helen over the raising of their son. Williams is also not liked by his crew - co-pilot John Smithback, engineer Howard Whitney, and navigator Jed Sutton - who resent Williams' overbearing attitude.

The other crew and passengers have a variety of concerns. They include Teddy Burton, a child on the flight whose dog Wilbur is in the rear cargo area of the airliner. Bernice Willouby is an anxious flyer, while first-class passenger Maurice Stanley has been recently widowed and establishes a relationship with Willouby during the course of the flight. Businessmen Arthur White and Calvin Havelick are feuding with each other. Stewardess Ann Thatcher considers the co-pilot's advances unwelcome, but has to work with him.

Williams radios to a nearby U.S. destroyer for help, and alerts everyone on board to ready themselves for a crash landing at sea. As they prepare for the ditching, Williams realizes that landing at night is too perilous, and they circle until sunrise. During the delay, Williams realizes that his attitude has been too harsh, and Ann Thatcher reconsiders her attitude to the co-pilot. When the airliner hits the water, the passengers, who are violently tossed about, recover and climb out to the deployed life rafts. All are saved, and Williams rescues the dog, which he had previously told the boy would have to be abandoned. Eventually, Williams reunites with his wife and son in Lisbon.

== Cast ==
- Gary Merrill as Captain Steve Williams
- Nancy Davis as Helen Williams
- Irene Hervey as Bernice Willouby
- Roger Smith as John Smithback
- Bek Nelson as Nancy Arthur
- Jewell Lain as Ann Thatcher
- Sheridan Comerate as Howard Whitney
- Richard Newton as Jed Sutton
- Richard Keith as Harrison White
- Celia Lovsky as Mrs. Ortega
- Lewis Martin as Maurice Stanley
- Hal Torey as Calvin Havelick
- John McNamara as Phil Burton

Uncredited (in order of appearance)
Rodolfo Hoyos	Carlos Ortega, tourist-class passenger with his grandmother, Mrs. Ortega
Frederick Ledebur	Orthodox priest at Lisbon airport speaking in French to two nuns, subsequently seated in tourist class
Frank J. Scannell	Captain Marsh, scheduling flight crew assignments
I. Stanford Jolley	Ed Wheaton, tourist-class passenger flying with his wife

== Production ==
Prolific B-Movie director Fred F. Sears had been renowned for "quickies", films that were shot on tiny budgets and often worked on a number of projects at once, from feature films to television shows. After his death in November 1957, Crash Landing (originally known by the working title "Rescue at Sea") was one of five films that were finished but remained unreleased for a year.

The real ditching of Pan Am Flight 6 had occurred in October 1956. Sears quickly completed all pre-production efforts, including script, casting, crew, and budget, so that production of Crash Landing was able to start on August 6, 1957, and wrapped in 10 days, with both studio and location photography completed in the typical Sears fashion.

Principal location photography took place at the Hollywood Burbank Airport, playing the part of Lisbon Airport. The aircraft seen in the film include a United Airlines Convair CV 240 and Douglas DC-6 as well as DC-6s from American Airlines and Western Airlines. The principal airliner featured in Crash Landing was a Douglas DC-7C, seen in miniature and in stock footage.

== Reception ==
=== Release ===
Crash Landing was released in July 1958 on a double bill with Sears' Going Steady, which he directed in September 1957.

=== Critical ===
Crash Landing was an early disaster film preceded by The High and the Mighty (1954). Following some of the now-familiar plot devices in disaster films, as a recent review by Jeff Stafford noted, "There’s also plenty of drama going on in the passenger section with an assortment of disagreeable and problematic travellers caught up in their own personal crisis." Stafford further described the climactic crash as "As for the final splashdown in 'Crash Landing', it’s bound to be a disappointment for most considering the big dramatic buildup to it, but did you really expect much from a Sam Katzman-Fred F. Sears production? A miniature model airplane, some jerky camera movements, a water tank and some intensely dramatic music, courtesy of composer Mischa Bakaleinikoff ..."

== In popular culture ==
A scene where passenger Maurice Stanley offers Mrs. Willouby a cup of coffee is parodied in the satirical comedy film Airplane!, with their respective roles assumed by child actors David Hollander and Michelle Stacy.
