= Flight 845 =

Flight 845 may refer to

- Pan Am Flight 845, crashed on 30 July 1971
- Pan Am Flight 845/26, ditched on 26 March 1955
