= Pan Am Flight 7 =

1957 aircraft accident in the Pacific Ocean

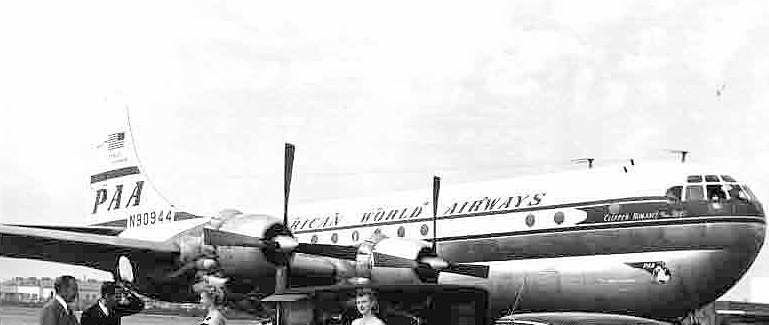
- N90944, the aircraft involved in the accident, seen in 1952

Accident
- Date: November 8, 1957
- Summary: Crash, cause undetermined
- Site: Pacific Ocean; 29°26′N 143°34′W

Aircraft
- Aircraft type: Boeing 377 Stratocruiser 10-29
- Aircraft name: Clipper Romance of the Skies
- Operator: Pan American World Airways
- Call sign: CLIPPER 7
- Registration: N90944
- Flight origin: San Francisco International Airport
- Destination: Honolulu International Airport
- Occupants: 44
- Passengers: 36
- Crew: 8
- Fatalities: 44
- Survivors: 0

Map showing the flight's origin, planned destination, and approximate crash site

Pan Am Flight 7 was a westbound round-the-world flight operated by Pan American World Airways. On November 8, 1957, the Boeing 377 Stratocruiser serving the flight, named Clipper Romance of the Skies, crashed in the Pacific Ocean en route to Honolulu International Airport from San Francisco. The crash killed all 36 passengers and eight crew members.

The flight's fate was not known until about nine hours after its last known radio transmission, by which point the plane would have run out of fuel. No radio reports of any emergencies were received from the flight crew. Under the assumption that the plane could have survived a controlled landing on the ocean surface, the United States Coast Guard launched an extensive search for the plane and any survivors. The week-long hunt became the largest search and rescue operation in the Pacific Ocean up to that date. The bodies of 19 of the victims and pieces of the plane were eventually recovered about 900 nautical miles (1,000 mi; 1,700 km) northeast of Honolulu.

Investigations into the cause of the crash were inconclusive. Despite theories that the plane may have been brought down by sabotage, poor maintenance, or an in-flight fire, investigators could not find enough evidence to support any definite conclusion. The final report from the Civil Aeronautics Board (CAB), which conducted the investigation, concluded that the board did not have enough evidence to determine the cause of the accident.

== Background ==
In 1947, Pan American World Airways (Pan Am) offered the first regularly scheduled round-the-world flights, westbound from the west coast of the United States, or eastbound from the east coast. The flights stopped in multiple cities over the course of several days before ending the trip on the opposite coast. Passengers on these flights had the option to include extended stopovers in any of the cities along the way until a later flight departed the city. In November 1957, Flight 7 was the flight number assigned to one of the company's westbound round-the-world flights, which departed San Francisco International Airport on Friday morning and included 15 intermediate stops (Note: Flight 7 left San Francisco, and stopped at (in chronological order) Honolulu, Wake Island, Tokyo, Hong Kong, Bangkok, Rangoon, Karachi, Beirut, Istanbul, Frankfurt, Brussels, London, Glasgow, Boston, and New York City, before finally arriving at Philadelphia.) before eventually arriving at Philadelphia International Airport on the following Wednesday.

== Flight ==
At 11:30 a.m. on November 8, 1957, Flight 7 left San Francisco on the first leg of the trip, to Honolulu International Airport. Flight 7 carried 36 passengers and 8 crew members, and was expected to take ten hours and fifteen minutes. The plane was one of Pan Am's long-range double-decker Boeing 377 Stratocruisers, named Clipper Romance of the Skies. It had enough fuel for approximately thirteen hours of flight, and was loaded to its maximum takeoff weight of 147,000 pounds (67,000 kg). The flight plan called for a cruising altitude of 10,000 feet (3,000 m) and an airspeed of 226 knots (260 mph; 420 km/h).

At 5:04 p.m., the captain made a routine position report while the flight was 1,028 nautical miles (1,180 mi; 1,900 km) east of Hawaii. He said the plane was cruising at an altitude of 10,000 feet (3,000 m) and was encountering headwinds of approximately 14 miles per hour (12 kn; 23 km/h). He was due to make his next position report at around 6:00 p.m., but there were no further communications. At 6:42 p.m., Pan Am notified the United States Coast Guard that it had not heard from the plane in more than 90 minutes, which was considered unusual, but not necessarily alarming. After another 90 minutes had passed without word from the flight, the Coast Guard dispatched the first search planes.

== Search ==
Four surface vessels, submarines USS Cusk and USS Carbonero, and a number of aircraft from Honolulu conducted the search on the first day. Military authorities were asked to prepare additional planes and ships to join the search at dawn. The searchers were unable to locate the missing flight; authorities held on to the hope that the flight's radio was malfunctioning. To address the possibility that Flight 7's navigation equipment had failed, the Coast Guard ordered all ships at Pearl Harbor to shine their lights into the sky so they could be seen by the flight and used as beacons. A military air transport plane reported spotting lights on the water, which caused a burst of activity, but it was later determined to be only the lights of a ship. At 3:00 a.m. on November 9, when all of the fuel aboard the plane would have been consumed, Robert Murray, Pan Am's executive vice president of the Pacific Alaska Division, declared that the plane was presumed to be "down" somewhere over the Pacific Ocean.

By the next day, the search party had been expanded to at least 30 aircraft and 14 surface vessels. USS Philippine Sea joined the search from Long Beach, California, with its helicopters and radar-equipped anti-submarine planes. A few hours later, USS John R. Craig and USS Orleck left San Diego to join the search. The Coast Guard enlarged the search area to 150,000 square miles (390,000 km^{2}) of the Pacific Ocean east of Hawaii. Pan Am dispatched a sister Stratocruiser from San Francisco, loaded with supplies that it could drop to the ocean surface if needed, and sent a Douglas DC-7 to the search area with enough fuel to stay airborne for 16 hours. The week-long search for the missing plane eventually became the largest search in the Pacific Ocean to that date. Pan Am officials expressed confidence that the craft could stay afloat "almost indefinitely" if it had been forced to land in the ocean and its fuselage had not been punctured.

During the search, three pilots reported that they had heard faint radio distress signals from a hand-operated emergency radio similar to the type that would have been taken aboard life rafts. The signals were heard on the 500 kilohertz distress frequency at the Coast Guard station at ʻUpolu Point on the island of Hawaii. There were ten such broadcasts, over a period of 45 minutes. One pilot reported hearing a series of numbers after the distress signals that he thought ended in the numbers "four four", the last two numbers of the missing aircraft's tail number, N90944. The Coast Guard concluded that the signal was a false alarm and might have come from the mainland or from an unknown party testing their equipment. Pan Am pilots who were personal friends of the lost crew listened to recordings of the radio transmissions and said it was unlikely that the messages had originated from the missing flight. A Pan Am pilot en route between San Francisco and Honolulu also reported seeing a yellow, cylindrical object about 2 by 4 feet (60 by 120 cm), with a dye marker nearby. Three submarines, eight Coast Guard vessels, and five merchant ships converged on the area, but found nothing.

On November 14, the crew of a Navy search plane observed wreckage and bodies in the water, about 900 nautical miles (1,000 mi; 1,700 km) northeast of Honolulu, and about 90 nautical miles (100 mi; 170 km) north of the flight's intended track. One of the victims was still strapped in a seat. A total of 19 victims were pulled from the water; 14 of them were wearing life jackets, and none of them had shoes on, suggesting that the passengers had received some advance warning before the crash. Three of the victims had watches that had stopped at 5:27, 23 minutes after the plane's last radio report. The Navy reported that all of the victims had external injuries and multiple fractures, and concluded that the plane had probably struck the water with tremendous force. The bodies and debris were recovered from a 33-square-mile (85 km^{2}) area of the ocean. Rear Admiral T. A. Ahroon, commander of Philippine Sea, reported that there was no evidence that a midair explosion had occurred, but the Navy also found that many of the pieces of debris bore distinct evidence of fire damage. Searchers were unable to recover any of the major components of the airliner; the depth of the ocean in that area was around 16,500 feet (5,000 m), which meant that any wreckage on the bottom would be too deep to locate or recover.

== Aircraft ==
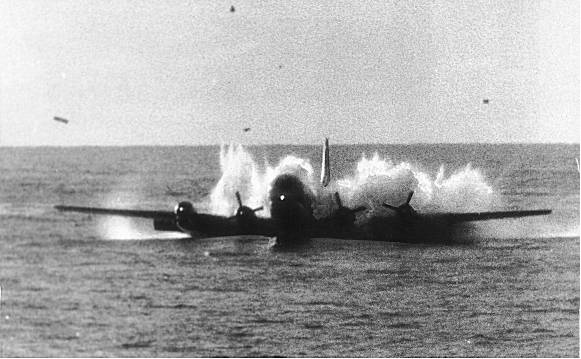
Pan Am Flight 6, whose aircraft was named the Sovereign of the Skies, ditching in the Pacific Ocean on October 16, 1956

The missing aircraft was a Boeing 377 Stratocruiser 10–29 with serial number 15960 and registered with tail number N90944. It first flew on August 30, 1949, as Flagship Ireland for American Overseas Airlines (AOA), and was transferred to Pan Am on September 28, 1950, after Pan Am's acquisition of AOA.

At the time of the accident, the airframe had accumulated a total of 23,690 logged flying hours. The four engines of the aircraft had total times ranging from 13,459 hours to 16,961 hours, and had been overhauled within the last 1,249 hours of flight. Investigations by the Civil Aeronautics Board (CAB) found that "the aircraft, engines, and propellers had been maintained as prescribed and were within their time limitations."

The accident was the second worst accident involving the Stratocruiser. The aircraft type had a long history of mechanical problems. Several of the aircraft had experienced runaway propellers, a situation where the pilots were unable to control the pitch of the propellers. In those situations, centrifugal force caused the blades to adjust to the lowest pitch, leading to aerodynamic instability. In 1952, Pan Am Flight 202 crashed in the Amazon basin after its engine and propeller failed in flight. In 1955, Pan Am Flight 845/26 ditched in the Pacific Ocean off the coast of Oregon with four fatalities after one of the aircraft's propellers failed and caused the engine to separate from the wing.

The aircraft assigned to Flight 7 had experienced two incidents shortly before its final flight. On June 18, 1957, it had suffered a runaway propeller as it departed San Francisco. The crew was unable to resolve the situation in the air, turned around, and performed an emergency landing back at the airport. On September 19, 1957, during a flight between San Francisco and Honolulu, the crew heard a loud noise that they described as "similar to dropping the navigation stool on the flight deck". In-flight inspections were performed and the plane landed without incident after the crew found no abnormalities. A Pan Am inspector later investigated and found nothing out of the ordinary, arguing in his report that similar noises could be produced during normal activities.

The aircraft that had been built immediately before the plane assigned to Flight 7 had also crashed the year before. Named the Sovereign of the Skies, with serial number 15959, it was assigned to Pan Am Flight 6. The plane encountered mechanical problems and had ditched in the Pacific Ocean on October 16, 1956, after two of its engines had failed. All 31 people aboard on Flight 6 had been rescued, but the tail broke off on impact and the plane sank only 22 minutes after the forced landing, preventing a detailed investigation into the cause of the engine failures.

== Passengers and crew ==
The flight carried 36 passengers and 8 crew members on the flight to Honolulu. Upon arrival, 20 of the passengers were scheduled to disembark, while 16 would have continued onward at least as far as Tokyo. Thirty-two of the passengers were from the United States, while one each was from Australia, Japan, Turkey, and Indonesia. At Honolulu, 17 passengers were waiting to board the plane for the next segment of the flight.

The captain of the flight was Gordon H. Brown, age 40, who had been flying for Pan Am since his 1942 graduation from Northeastern University. At the time of Flight 7, he had accumulated 11,314 hours of flight experience, including 674 hours in the Stratocruiser. The first officer of the flight, William P. Wygant, was 37 and had been employed with the company since 1946. He had a total of 7,355 flying hours, including 4,018 on the Stratocruiser. Second officer William H. Fortenberry, acting as pilot-navigator on the flight, had worked for Pan Am since graduating from Spartanburg Community College in 1951. He had a total of 2,683 flight hours, including 1,552 in the Stratocruiser. Flight engineer Albert F. Pinataro, 26 years old, had been employed with the company since 1955, and had a total of 1,596 hours of flight experience, all in the Stratocruiser.

== Civil Aeronautics Board investigation ==
Investigators from the CAB initiated an investigation as soon as Flight 7's fuel supplies were presumed to be exhausted, and began combing through maintenance and operations records of the plane and its equipment. When the wreckage had been located and had been recovered to Philippine Sea, which was still en route to Long Beach, CAB investigators and pathologists of the Armed Forces Institute of Pathology were flown to the carrier to begin their investigation. By the time it returned to port on November 18, four of the victims had been identified. Another six had been tentatively identified from their fingerprints and papers recovered from the bodies. None of the victims showed any evidence of being burned.

CAB investigators moved all of the recovered pieces of wreckage to a restricted area at the Pan Am overhaul station in San Francisco. The 500 pounds (230 kg) of recovered material mainly consisted of the fuselage's secondary structure, interior trim and equipment, and numerous packages of mail. The only non-fuselage part recovered was a section of an engine cowl support ring, which had been found embedded in a pillow that was found floating on the water. Representatives from Pan Am, the Federal Bureau of Investigation, and Boeing were invited to assist with the investigation. Some of the material bore evidence of fire damage. CAB investigators determined that the burns had occurred on the portions that had floated on the surface of the water, as each piece had a definite waterline below which burn marks were not found. Investigators found no evidence of an in-flight fire, and laboratory tests of the charred pieces did not find any traces of prohibited or explosive material.

In their investigation, CAB investigators considered the hazardous materials that were known to be in the plane's cargo hold. The forward cargo compartment contained a shipment of one and a quarter pounds (570 g) of sodium sulfide, which is a chemically reactive flammable solid material that would release hydrogen sulfide gas if exposed to moisture. Investigators concluded that the material was securely packaged in sealed glass containers within a wooden crate. The gas, which has a strong, foul odor, would have been detectable by the crew well before its concentration would have become dangerous. All tests for its presence on the recovered debris were negative. The cargo also contained several shipments of cellulose acetate film and a package containing a small amount of radioactive medicine packaged according to regulations. Although none of the cargo was recovered, investigators concluded that there was no reason to believe that any of the items had contributed to the accident.

CAB investigators also probed the maintenance history of the aircraft. Earlier in the year of the accident, the plane had been involved in two separate "hard" landings that were reported by crews. In the first incident, certificated mechanics performed a visual inspection of the aircraft. However, the maintenance records showed that one of the most time-consuming steps of the inspection, the inspection of the wing spar webs, had been skipped. In the second incident, the inspecting mechanics did not make a written report of the inspection. The CAB concluded that the somewhat cursory investigations performed by airline mechanics in these and other cases suggested that "the maintenance and airworthiness of the aircraft cannot be accepted as being normal in all respects," and recommended a reassessment of the airline's maintenance practices in the future.

Pathological examination of the victims revealed "possibly disabling" levels of carbon monoxide in 14 of the 19 recovered bodies. CAB investigators conducted a study to determine how high concentrations of the gas could have occurred in the fuselage, and identified several possible causes. Pathologists were uncertain whether the presence of the gas in the bodies could have been a result of decomposition that had occurred after the crash. Investigators concluded that one probable source of the gas was an unexpected failure in one of the engines, such as one that released a propeller or turbocharger disk into the fuselage. Such a failure could have easily caused a fire, disabled the radios, and caused serious flight control difficulties. Investigators concluded that the scenario fit the known circumstances better than any of the other hypotheses. One scenario considered was the malicious introduction of pure carbon monoxide into the flight cabin; the gas would have been undetectable and could have incapacitated the crew, resulting in the crash. Another possibility was that the acetate film in the cargo hold could have released carbon monoxide if it had been subjected to extreme heat. Investigators determined that five of the victims died from physical injuries received when the aircraft crashed, and most of the others died from drowning, possibly after being knocked unconscious or stunned by the crash.

Contrary to initial assumptions, CAB investigators concluded that the aircraft did not strike the water at a steep angle, but that it was almost a successful ocean landing that led to a crash only when the starboard wing dragged in the water.

Ultimately, the investigators could not determine the cause of the crash with any certainty, stating in their final report:

The Board has insufficient tangible evidence at this time to determine the cause of the accident. Further research and investigation is in process concerning the significance of evidence of carbon monoxide in body tissue of the aircraft occupants.

== Insurance investigation ==
Insurance officials also conducted an investigation to determine whether any of the passengers had purchased large insurance policies before boarding the flight. In 1949, Albert Guay had planted a bomb aboard Canadian Pacific Air Lines Flight 108 in a plot to kill his wife and collect the insurance money. In 1955, Jack Gilbert Graham had planted a bomb in his mother's suitcase aboard United Airlines Flight 629 after purchasing a life insurance policy at the airport. With those incidents in mind, investigators searched for any unusual insurance purchases by the passengers of Flight 7. Mercury Insurance reported that it had carried a total of $230,000 (Note: equivalent to $2,600,000 in 2025) in insurance policies for the flight's passengers, and said that the amount was not unusual. CAB investigators dismissed the possibility of insurance-motivated sabotage, reporting that "no untoward amount" of life insurance had been taken out on any of the occupants of the plane.

In 1958, a year after the crash, news reports revealed that the Western Life Insurance Company of Helena, Montana, had refused to pay out a $20,000 (Note: equivalent to $220,000 in 2025) life insurance policy purchased shortly before the flight for one of the passengers. The passenger, a 41-year-old man from Scott Bar, California, named William Payne, had also purchased two air trip policies at the airport totaling $125,000. (Note: equivalent to $1,400,000 in 2025) Payne's body was not one of the 19 recovered from the crash scene and the insurance company contended that there was no evidence that he was actually a passenger on the flight or that he had died. At the time of the crash, Payne was heavily in debt; the company claimed that the reasons he gave for his trip to Honolulu did not justify the expense involved. Payne was an honorably discharged Navy veteran with 22 years of service and was an explosives expert. His widow, Harriet Payne, had also filed a $300,000 (Note: equivalent to $3,300,000 in 2025) damage suit against Pan Am earlier that year, and denied the claim that her husband was not aboard Flight 7 when it went down. She filed a lawsuit against the insurance company to compel it to pay off the policy. CAB investigators said that laboratory examination of the plane's wreckage had ruled out the possibility of a bomb explosion of any kind aboard the aircraft. Pan Am investigators later admitted that they had investigated Payne because of his past explosives experience, the amount of insurance purchased, and the fact that he purchased a one-way ticket to Honolulu when he was heavily in debt. The judge in the Western Life Insurance Company lawsuit was critical of the company's efforts to avoid paying the insurance claim. The court ordered the company to pay the full amount of the policy, and to refund the additional premiums Western Life Insurance forced the widow to continue paying after refusing to honor the claim.

== Legacy ==
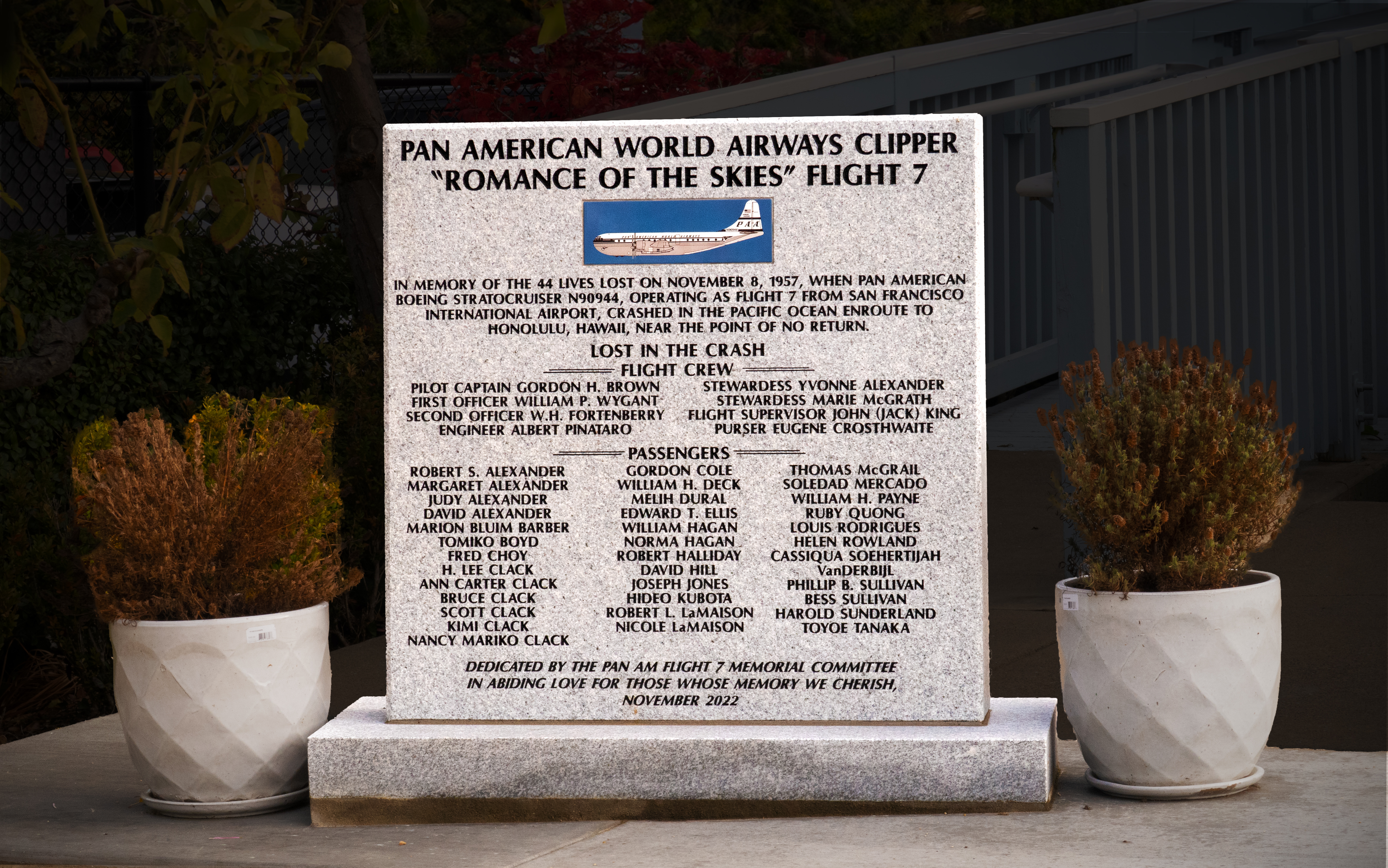
Pan Am Flight 7 memorial monument

A memorial to honor those lost on the flight was unveiled at the Millbrae History Museum in Millbrae, California, on April 4, 2023.
