= Home to Danger =

1951 British film directed by Terence Fisher

- Directed by: Terence Fisher
- Written by: Ian Stuart Black; Francis Edge; John Temple-Smith
- Produced by: Lance Comfort
- Starring: Guy Rolfe; Rona Anderson; Francis Lister; Stanley Baker
- Cinematography: Reginald H. Wyer
- Edited by: Francis Edge
- Music by: Malcolm Arnold
- Production company: New World Pictures
- Distributed by: Eros Films
- Release date: August 1951
- Running time: 66 minutes
- Country: United Kingdom
- Language: English

Home to Danger is a 1951 British second feature film noir directed by Terence Fisher starring Guy Rolfe, Rona Anderson and Stanley Baker. It was written by Francis Edge and John Temple-Smith from a scenario by Ian Stuart Black.

== Plot ==
Barbara Cummings returns to Britain following the death of her estranged, wealthy father who is believed to have committed suicide. It is expected that the bulk of the estate will pass to his business partner. However, when the will is read she is given most of the money as a gesture of reconciliation by her father. She clings to her belief that he did not kill himself and investigates the circumstances of his death. Before long, plots are being hatched to kill her.

== Cast ==
- Guy Rolfe as Robert Irving
- Rona Anderson as Barbara Cummings
- Francis Lister as Howard Wainright
- Alan Wheatley as Hughes
- Bruce Belfrage as Brooks, the solicitor
- Peter Jones as "Lips" Leonard
- Stanley Baker as Willie Dougan
- Dennis Harkin as Jimmy "Jimmy-The-One"
- Philo Hauser as Mick O'Ryan
- Cyril Conway as Inspector Bayne
- Betty Henderson as Mary Williams, the housekeeper
- Amy Dalby as Jessica Morton, the cook
- Christopher Hodge as PC Higgins

== Production ==
The film was made at the Riverside Studios in Hammersmith with sets designed by the art director Cedric Dawe.

In the opening sequence of the film Rona Anderson is shown exiting the rear door of a Boeing 377 Stratocruiser belonging to the British Overseas Airways Corporation, with registration G-ALSA. This aircraft was destroyed in the 1954 Prestwick air disaster.

== Critical reception ==
Kine Weekly wrote: "Well cast and competently directed, its Grand Guignol atmosphere is steadily built up with tense situations culminating in a grandstand manhunt climax. ...More of a 'whose next' than a 'who-dunnit,' the film quickly establishes a fairly tense atmosphere and discreetly leaves romance dallying in the background, yet without any loss of feminine appeal. ... Definitely the stuff, this, for those who prefer homicide without trimmings."

Picturegoer wrote: "Quite an entertaining little thriller, concise and compact."

In British Sound Films: The Studio Years 1928–1959 David Quinlan rated the film as "average", writing: "Not too good; but lively."

Leslie Halliwell said: "Tuppenny shocker, quite amusing in its way."

The Radio Times Guide to Films gave the film 2/5 stars, writing: "As the corpses mount up, so do the suspects in this standard whodunnit, directed by Terence Fisher, who later hit his stride with his Hammer horrors."

Britmovie thought the film a "tense murder-mystery b-movie."
