= Pan Am Flight 6 =

1956 aviation accident in the Pacific Ocean

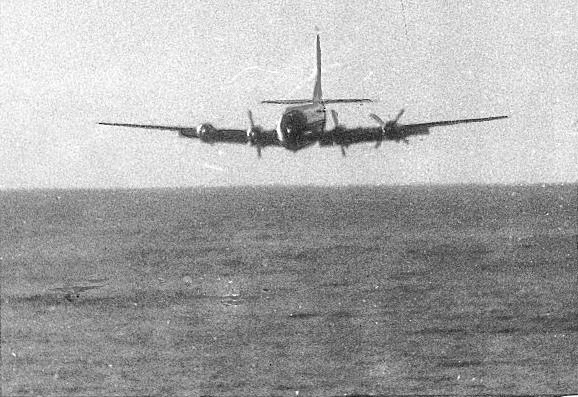
- The aircraft moments before ditching in the Pacific Ocean

Accident
- Date: October 16, 1956
- Summary: Engine failure, ditching at sea
- Site: Pacific Ocean Northeast of Hawaii; 30°02′N 140°09′W

Aircraft
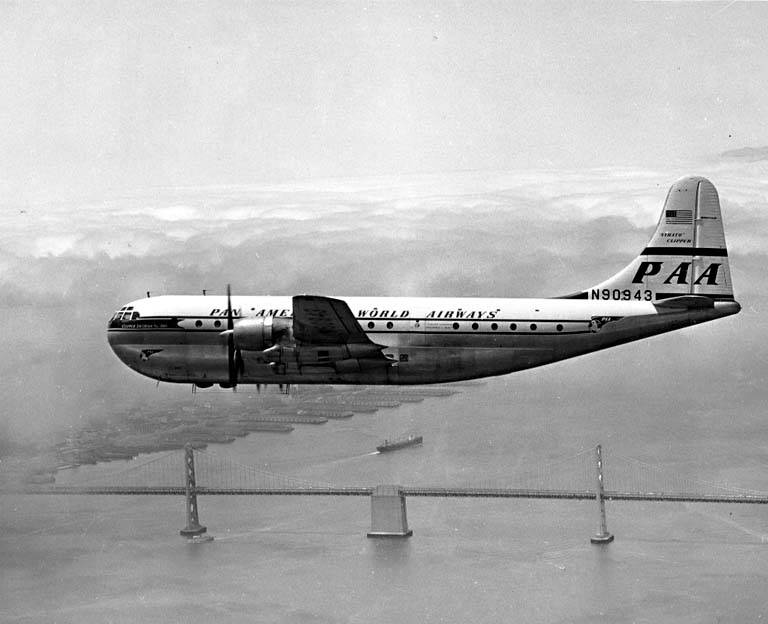
- N90943, the aircraft involved in the accident, seen in 1947
- Aircraft type: Boeing 377 Stratocruiser 10-29
- Aircraft name: Clipper Sovereign Of The Skies
- Operator: Pan American World Airways
- Call sign: CLIPPER 6
- Registration: N90943
- Flight origin: Marine Air Terminal, New York City
- Stopover: London Heathrow Airport, London
- 1st stopover: Frankfurt Airport, Frankfurt
- 2nd stopover: Beirut International Airport, Beirut
- 3rd stopover: Drigh Road Airstrip, Karachi
- 4th stopover: Yangon International Airport, Rangoon
- 5th stopover: Don Mueang International Airport, Bangkok
- 6th stopover: Kai Tak Airport, Hong Kong; Tokyo International Airport, Tokyo
- Last stopover: Honolulu International Airport, Honolulu
- Destination: San Francisco International Airport, San Francisco
- Passengers: 24
- Crew: 7
- Fatalities: 0
- Survivors: 31

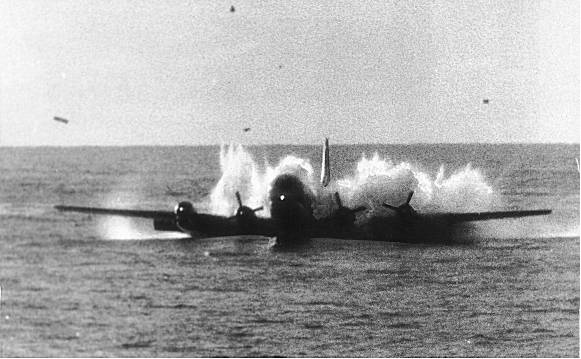
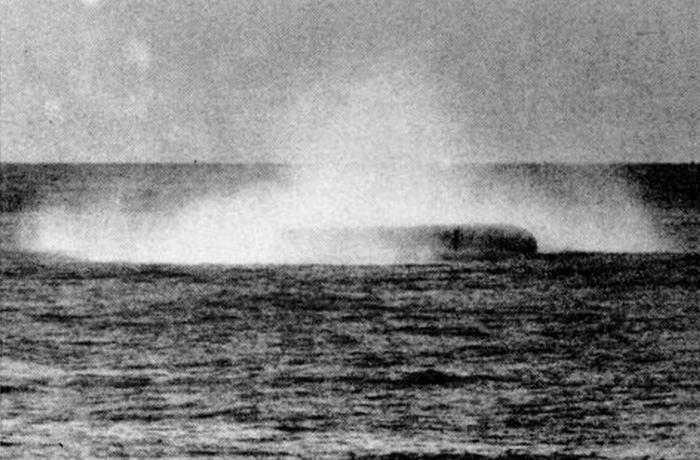
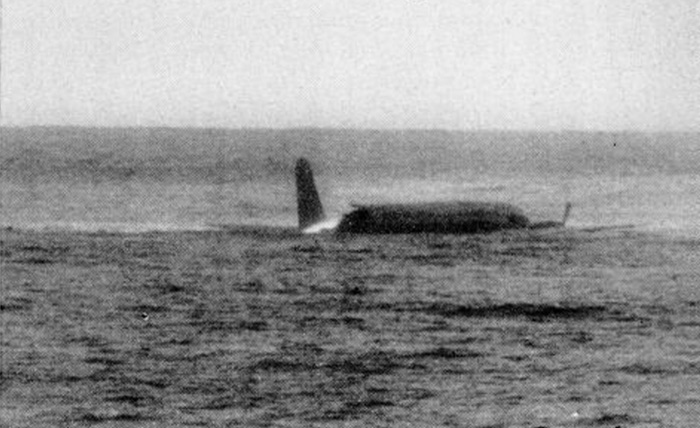
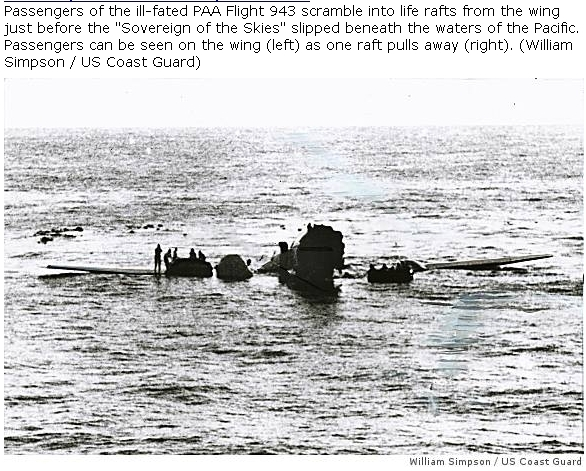
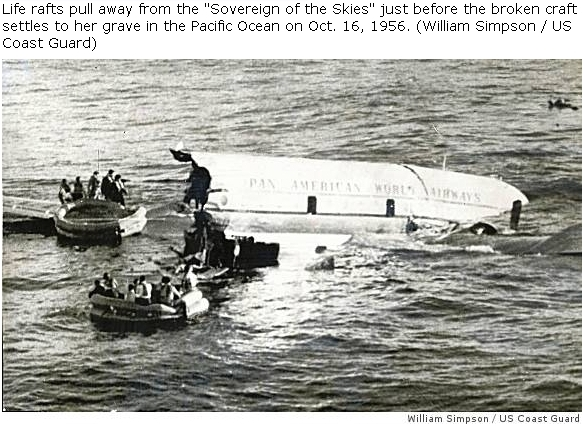
Pan Am Flight 6 ditching

Pan Am Flight 6 (registration N90943, and sometimes erroneously called Flight 943) was a round-the-world airline flight that ditched in the Pacific Ocean on October 16, 1956, after two of its four engines failed. Flight 6 left Philadelphia on October 12 as a DC-6B and flew eastward to Europe and Asia on a multi-stop trip. On the evening of October 15 the flight left Honolulu on a Boeing 377 Stratocruiser Clipper named Sovereign Of The Skies (Pan Am fleet number 943, registered N90943). The accident was the basis for the 1958 film Crash Landing.

== Accident details ==
The aircraft took off from Honolulu, Territory of Hawaii, at 8:26 p.m. HST on the flight's last leg to San Francisco. After passing the point of equal time, the flight received permission to climb to an altitude of 21,000 ft (6,400 m). When that altitude was reached, at about 1:20 a.m., the No. 1 engine began to overspeed as power was reduced. The first officer, George Haaker, who was flying the plane, immediately slowed the plane by further reducing power and by extending the flaps, and an attempt was made to feather the propeller. The propeller would not feather and the engine continued to turn at excessive revolutions per minute (RPM). Captain Richard Ogg decided to cut off the oil supply to the engine. Eventually, the RPM declined and the engine seized. There was a violent thud as the drive shaft broke and the propeller continued to windmill in the air stream, causing drag that increased the fuel consumption. With the flaps down to reduce speed and the extra drag of the windmilling propeller, the plane was forced to fly more slowly, below 150 knots (170 mph; 280 km/h), and lost altitude at the rate of 1,000 feet per minute (5.1 m/s). Climb power was set on the remaining three engines to slow the rate of descent.

In the 1950s and 1960s, the United States Coast Guard maintained a cutter at Ocean Station November midway between Hawaii and the California coast. This ship was able to provide weather information and passed on radio messages to aircraft in the vicinity. On that night, the ship was the 255-foot (78 m) USCGC Pontchartrain. The Pontchartrain was contacted and gave Flight 6 a ditching heading determined by weather and sea conditions in case they were required to ditch.

The No. 4 engine subsequently began to fail and soon was producing only partial power at full throttle. At 2:45 a.m., the No. 4 engine began to backfire, forcing the crew to shut it down and feather the propeller. The flaps were retracted, power on engines 2 and 3 increased to maximum except takeoff (METO). Captain Ogg was faced with an airplane which could not fly above 142 knots (163 mph; 263 km/h) without an alarming increase in the number one propeller speed or below 137 knots (158 mph; 254 km/h) without encountering stall warning buffet. Due to increased drag and reduced power, the Stratocruiser was descending at 500 to 1,000 feet (150 to 300 m) per minute. It was necessary to dump fuel to remain aloft. The crew calculated the added drag left them with insufficient fuel to reach San Francisco or to return to Honolulu. Captain Ogg radioed a message: "PanAm 90943, Flight 6, declaring an emergency over the Pacific". Captain Ogg elected to remain aloft until dawn to increase the chances of ditching successfully. Captain Ogg informed the Pontchartrain and the plane flew to the cutter's location, leveled off at 2,000 feet (610 m), and flew above it in eight-mile (13 km) circles on the two remaining engines until daylight.

Captain Ogg had decided to wait for daylight, since it was important to keep the wings level with the ocean swells at the ditching impact. That would be easier to achieve in full sunlight, improving the odds that passengers could be rescued, but he became concerned that the ocean waves were beginning to rise. As the plane circled the Coast Guard cutter, it was able to climb from 2,000 to 5,000 feet (610 to 1,520 m). At that altitude several practice approaches were made to see that the plane would be controllable at low speed (the goal was to have the lowest speed possible, just before touching the water). Delaying the ditching also ensured that more fuel would be consumed, making the plane lighter so it would float longer and minimizing the risk of fire in the event of a crash landing. Captain Ogg informed the passengers of his plans and developments in what he described as a "chatting" manner. He as well as the rest of the cockpit crew visited the passenger cabin to set the passengers at ease.

Aware of the Pan Am Flight 845/26 accident the year before, in which a Boeing 377's tail section had broken off during a water landing, the captain told the flight's purser to clear passengers from the back of the plane. The crew removed loose objects from the cabin, and prepared the passengers for the landing. As on other flights of the era, small children were allowed on their parents' laps, without separate seats or seat belts.

At 5:40 a.m. Captain Ogg notified Pontchartrain that he was preparing to ditch. The cutter laid out a foam path for a best ditch heading of 315 degrees, to aid the captain to judge his height above the water. After a dry run the plane touched down at 6:15 a.m., at 90 knots (100 mph; 170 km/h) with full flaps and landing gear retracted, in sight of the Pontchartrain at 30°02′N 140°09′W. On touching the water, the plane moved along the surface for a few hundred yards before one wing hit a swell, causing the plane to rotate nearly 180 degrees to port, damaging the nose section and breaking off the tail. All 31 on board survived the ditching. Three life rafts were deployed by the crew and passengers who had been assigned to help. One raft failed to inflate properly, but rescue boats from the cutter were able to promptly transfer the passengers from that raft. All were rescued by the Coast Guard before the last pieces of wreckage sank at 6:35 a.m. Crew on the cutter filmed the landing and the rescue. A ten-minute film was later produced, including a re-enacted recording of the radio conversation between the pilot and the Coast Guard.

The passengers were housed in the ship's officers' quarters and returned to San Francisco several days later. There were a few minor injuries, including an 18-month-old girl who bumped her head during the impact and was knocked unconscious. Forty-four cases of live canaries in the cargo hold were lost when the plane sank.

Some time later, the crew received awards for their work on the flight, having prevented any fatalities. Pilot Richard Ogg was the first recipient of the Civilian Airmanship Awards presented by the Order of Daedalians.

=== Probable cause ===
An investigation report summarized the incident: "An initial mechanical failure which precluded feathering the No. 1 propeller and a subsequent mechanical failure which resulted in a complete loss of power from the no. 4 engine, the effects of which necessitated a ditching."

== Flight crew ==
- Captain Richard N. Ogg, age 43
- First Officer George L. Haaker, age 40
- Navigator Richard L. Brown, age 31
- Flight Engineer Frank Garcia Jr., age 30

== Books and periodicals ==
- Adams, Michael R. (2010). Ocean Station: Operations of the U.S. Coast Guard, 1940–1977. Eastport, Maine: Nor'easter Press. ISBN 978-0-9779200-1-3. [Describes the ditching of Sovereign of the Skies and the rescue of its passengers and crew by the crew of USCGC Pontchartrain.]
- Brean, Herbert (October 29, 1956). "Ordeal On Flight 943: The Last Five Hours". Life. pp. 23–30.
- Ogg, Richard (March 25, 1957). "Pilot Describes Stratocruiser Ditching". Aviation Week. pp. 133–142.

== Dramatization ==
It is featured in season 1, episode 1, of the TV show Why Planes Crash. It has also been featured in Mysteries at the Museum (season 13, episode 12). A narrated ten minute official compilation of USCG film of the event is available online. A film combining sections of that film with 2017 interview excerpts of the Flight Engineer Frank Garcia by the Pan Am Museum is also online.

== See also ==
- Aeroflot Flight 366
- List of accidents and incidents involving commercial aircraft
- US Airways Flight 1549
- Pan Am Flight 7
