= Línea Internacional Aérea =

Línea Internacional Aérea (LIA) was an Ecuadorian airline that operated in South America, North America, Central America, and the Caribbean between 1958 and 1963.

== History ==
Línea Internacional Aérea (LIA) was formed in 1957 by Captain Everett E. Jones, who owned 20% of the shares. Jones had previously founded the cargo airline RANSA (Rutas Aéreas Nacionales S.A.) in Venezuela. LIA was designated as an Ecuadorian flag carrier and could also operate international services from Ecuador. It initially operated from September 1958 between Guayaquil and the Galapagos Islands using two Curtiss C-46 Commandos (registered HC-ACZ and HC-ACP). He later purchased a Boeing 377 Stratocruiser (dual registration HC-AGA and HC-AFS) that had belonged to Pan Am and used it on the country's main route between Quito and Guayaquil.

On August 24, 1960, the U.S. Federal Aviation Administration granted LIA a three-year permit to operate flights between Ecuador and Miami via Panama, San Andrés Island, and Havana, or via Bogotá and Kingston. However, the authorization to operate scheduled flights to Miami was revoked in 1961, as Everett Jones had been suspected of shady political maneuvers in Venezuela.

Captain Everett Jones began to encounter legal problems in Venezuela around this time, as vice president of RANSA, and LIA's operations in Ecuador abruptly halted in 1963, with the Boeing 377 Stratocruiser abandoned at Guayaquil Airport. It is reported that the plane made a single flight to Quito's Mariscal Sucre International Airport and narrowly missed its departure, as the Boeing 377 was not suitable for operating at high-altitude airports.

== Fleet ==
Former fleet of LIA
Aircraft	Total	Introduced	Retired	Registration
Boeing 377 Stratocruiser	1	1960	1963	HC-AGA (also registered as HC-AFS)
Curtiss C-46 Commando	2	1958	1962	HC-ACZ and HC-ACP

== Former Destinations ==
Former destinations of LIA
Country	Destination	Airport
Colombia	Bogotá	El Dorado International Airport
Colombia	San Andrés	Gustavo Rojas Pinilla International Airport
Cuba	Havana	José Martí International Airport
Ecuador	Guayaquil	Simon Bolivar International Airport
Ecuador	Baltra Island	Seymour Airport
Ecuador	San Cristóbal Island	San Cristóbal Airport
Ecuador	Quito	Mariscal Sucre International Airport
United States	Miami	Miami International Airport
Jamaica	Kingston	Norman Manley International Airport
Panama	Panama City	Aeropuerto Internacional de Tocumen
