= Kenneth Davidson (cricketer) =

English cricketer

Kenneth Richard Davidson (24 December 1905 – 25 December 1954) was an English first-class cricketer, who played thirty matches for Yorkshire County Cricket Club from 1933 to 1935, and one game for Scotland against Yorkshire in 1938. Slightly unusually for someone who played comparatively little, he was awarded his county cap in 1935. He was an amateur until after the 1933 season, but turned professional and scored 1,241 runs. He ultimately thought he was too old for a professional career in cricket.

Born in Leeds, Yorkshire, and before he played county cricket, he turned out for Bingley and Leeds, whom he captained for a period. He also played badminton, a sport which he helped to promote in the United States.

A right-handed batsman, he scored 1,355 runs in all first-class cricket at an average of 31.51, and a highest score of 128 against Kent. His other century, 101*, came against the Marylebone Cricket Club (MCC) and he made seven scores of 50 or over. He bowled just five balls, which went for four runs.

Having just celebrated his forty-ninth birthday the previous day, Davidson was tragically killed on Christmas Day 1954, at Prestwick Aerodrome, Ayrshire, Scotland, in an air accident.
