= Boeing 377 Stratocruiser =

US airliner with 4 piston engines, 1947

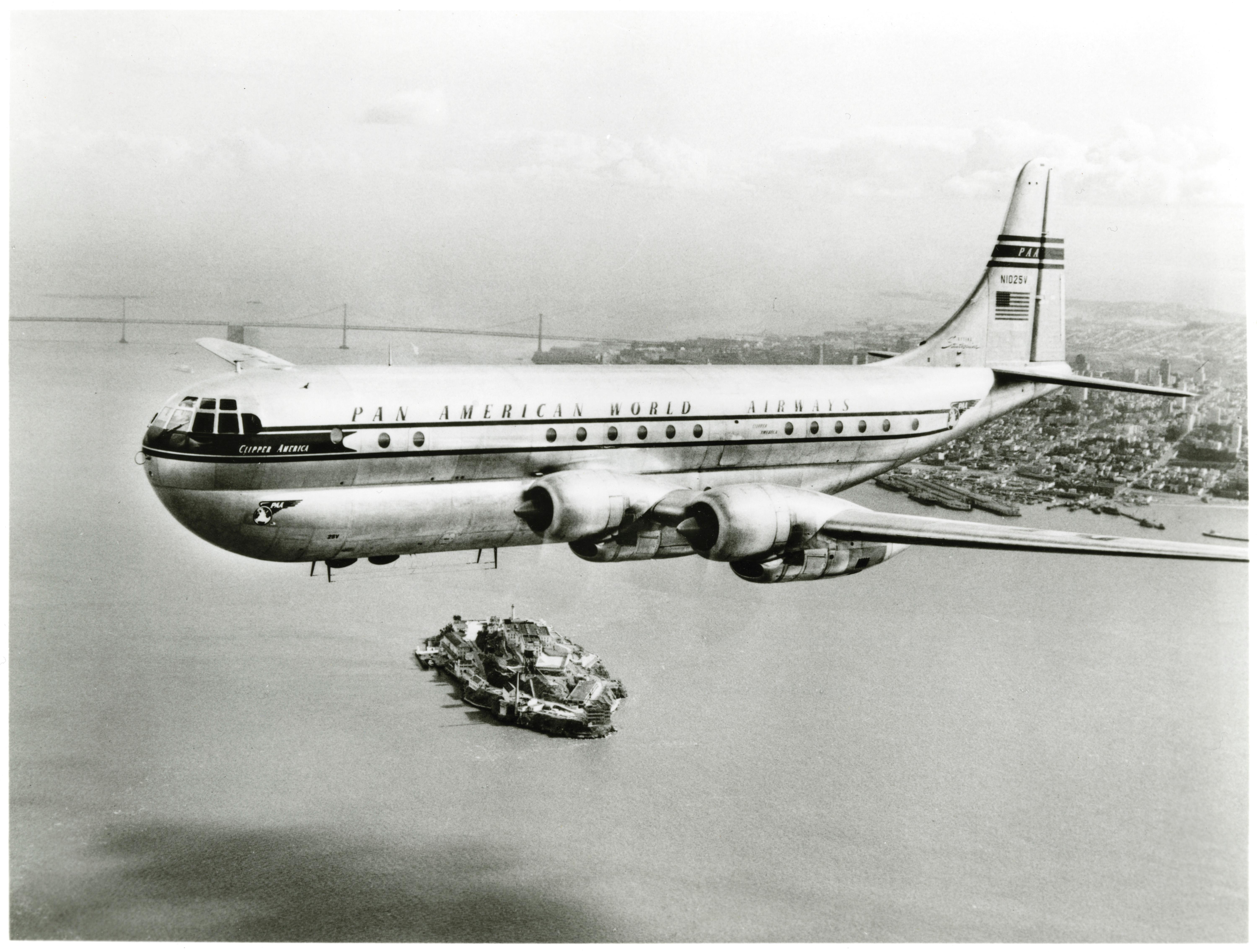
- A Pan Am Stratocruiser over San Francisco Bay

General information
- Type: Airliner
- National origin: United States
- Manufacturer: Boeing Commercial Airplanes
- Primary users: Pan American World Airways BOAC; Northwest Airlines
- Number built: 56

History
- Introduction date: 1 April 1949, with Pan American World Airways
- First flight: 8 July 1947
- Retired: 1963
- Developed from: Boeing B-29 Superfortress; Boeing C-97 Stratofreighter
- Developed into: Aero Spacelines Pregnant Guppy; Aero Spacelines Super Guppy; Aero Spacelines Mini Guppy

The Boeing 377 Stratocruiser was a large long-range airliner developed from the C-97 Stratofreighter military transport, itself a derivative of the B-29 Superfortress. The Stratocruiser's first flight was on 8 July 1947. Design features included passenger decks and a pressurized cabin. It could carry up to 100 passengers on the main deck plus 14 in the lower deck lounge; typical seating was for 63 or 84 passengers or 28 berthed and five seated passengers.

The Stratocruiser was larger than the Douglas DC-6 and Lockheed Constellation and cost more to buy and operate. Its reliability was poor, mainly due to problems with the four 28-cylinder Pratt & Whitney R-4360 Wasp Major radial engines and structural and control problems with their propellers. Only 55 Stratocruisers were built for airlines, along with the single prototype. One was converted into the Aero Spacelines Pregnant Guppy by John M. Conroy for NASA's Gemini space program.

== Design and development ==
Boeing 377 seating arrangement.

The Boeing 377 Stratocruiser was a civil derivative of the Boeing Model 367, the Boeing C-97 Stratofreighter, which first flew in late 1944. William Allen, who had become president of the Boeing Company in September 1945, sought to introduce a new civilian aircraft to replace reduced military production after World War II. Boeing saw in their large-bodied, fast, and long-ranged military transport potential for a passenger aircraft suited for premium service on long transoceanic routes, expanding on the precedent set by their Boeing 314 Clipper with Pan American World Airways. Despite a recession in late 1945, Allen ordered 50 Stratocruisers, spending capital on the project without an order from an airline customer.

On 29 November 1945, Pan American World Airways (Pan Am) became the launch customer with the largest commercial aircraft order in history, a $24.5 million order for 20 Stratocruisers. Earlier in 1945, a Boeing C-97 had flown from Seattle to Washington, D.C. nonstop in six hours and four minutes; with this knowledge, and with Pan Am President Juan Trippe's high regard for Boeing after their success with the Boeing 314 Clipper, Pan Am was confident about ordering the expensive plane.

The 377 shared the distinctive design of the C-97, with a "double-bubble" fuselage cross-section, resembling a figure-8, with the smaller loop on the bottom, and 6,600 cubic feet (190 m^{3}) of interior space shared between two passenger decks. Outside diameter of the upper lobe was 132 inches (340 centimeters), compared to 125 inches (320 centimeters) for the DC-6 and other Douglas types (and 148 inches or 380 centimeters for today's 737). The lower deck served as a lounge, seating 14, earning it the nickname of "Stratoboozer." The 377 had innovations such as higher cabin pressure and air conditioning; the superchargers on the four Pratt & Whitney R-4360 engines increased power at altitude and allowed constant cabin pressure.

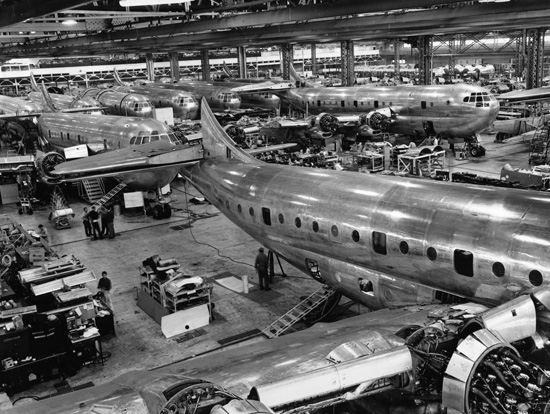
The Boeing 377 production line

The wing was the Boeing 117 airfoil. In all, 4 million man-hours went into the engineering of the 377. It was one of only a few double-deck aircraft ever built for commercial use, another being its French contemporary, the Breguet Deux-Ponts, as well as later models, the 747 and the Airbus A380.

The first flight of the 377 was on 8 July 1947, two years after the first commercial order. The flight test fleet of three 377s underwent 250,000 mi (217,000 nmi; 402,000 km) of flying to test its limits before certification.

Other carriers who adopted the Stratocruiser were British Overseas Airways Corporation, American Overseas Airlines (merged with Pan Am in 1950) and United Airlines. The last 377 was delivered to BOAC in May 1950. On this delivery flight, Boeing engineer Wellwood Beall accompanied the final 377 to England, and returned with news of the de Havilland Comet, the first jet airliner, and its appeal. The tenure of the Stratocruiser with United ended in 1954, when United had the opportunity to sell them to BOAC after finding them unprofitable without the extra mail subsidies enjoyed by Pan Am and Northwest.

Only 56 were built, one prototype (later reconditioned) and 55 production aircraft. As a result of low production volume, Boeing lost $7 million on the aircraft.

== Operational history ==
Boeing 377 upper-deck passenger cabin.

As the launch customer, Pan Am was the first to begin scheduled flights, from San Francisco to Honolulu in April 1949. At the end of 1949, Pan Am, BOAC and American Overseas Airlines (AOA) were flying 377s transatlantic, while Northwest Orient Airlines was flying in the United States; in January 1950, United began flights from San Francisco to Honolulu. Stratocruisers were pressed into emergency military service after the onset of the Korean War. In late 1950, Northwest Stratocruisers were serving New York City, Chicago, Detroit, Minneapolis/St. Paul, Milwaukee, Spokane, Seattle, and Honolulu.

Lower-deck passenger lounge.

By late 1952, Northwest Stratocruisers replaced DC-4s to Tokyo via Anchorage, Alaska; Northwest replaced the Stratocruiser on the Honolulu run in 1953 and to Tokyo in 1955. For a short time, Pan Am 377s flew to Beirut, Lebanon, but after 1954, no 377 was scheduled east of Europe or west of Singapore. In 1954, United Stratocruisers flew Los Angeles to Honolulu and between Seattle and San Francisco; United's B377 flights to Honolulu were all first class. In 1955, BOAC 377s had 50 First Class seats (fare $400 one way New York to London) or 81 Tourist seats (fare $290). In 1956, Pan Am 377s flew from Los Angeles and San Francisco to Sydney with stops at Honolulu, Canton Island and Suva (via Nadi Airport in Fiji).

By 1958, Pan Am was operating the Stratocruiser between Seattle, Washington and Fairbanks, Juneau and Ketchikan, Alaska and between Seattle and Whitehorse, Yukon. Within six years of first delivery, the Stratocruiser had carried 3,199,219 passengers; it had completed 3,597 transcontinental flights, and 27,678 transatlantic crossings, and went between the United States and South America 822 times. In these first six years, the Stratocruiser fleet had flown 169,859,579 miles (273,362,494 km).

Galley aboard a Boeing 377.

The 377 was one of the most advanced and capable propeller-driven transports, and among the most luxurious, but it was troubled by reliability issues and maintenance costs. Problems included catastrophic failures of propellers, failures of propeller pitch control leading to overspeed incidents, issues related to the poor thermal design of the engine and resultant aerodynamic problems. Its service record was marred by a high incidence of in-flight emergencies and hull-loss accidents related to those issues. The propellers were the subject of Airworthiness Directives in 1955, 1957, and 1958.

Boeing Company archival featurette for the 377 Stratocruiser.

In 1953, United's Chief Executive Ray Ireland described the aircraft as "unbeatable in luxury attraction but... uneconomical." Ireland said PAA's Stratocruiser competition to Hawaii induced United to buy the plane originally." In 1950, United's seven 377s averaged $2.46 "direct operating cost" per plane-mile, and "Indirect costs are generally considered to be equal or greater than the direct costs." Most operators used Stratocruisers on long-range routes where higher prices could be charged, off-setting the higher operating costs.

Passenger onboarding.

The exception was Northwest Airlines, which managed to keep the aircraft competitive on shorter U.S. domestic routes where the aircraft's higher payload capacity benefited from lower fuel weights. United however could not integrate their six-plane fleet of 377s. By 1954, the lack of spares and the inability to cross-train their Douglas crews with the type relegated their Stratocruisers primarily to their Hawaii route, where they faced stiff competition from Pan American and Northwest. By the end of that year, the six United 377s were all sold to BOAC in a deal orchestrated by Douglas Aircraft. BOAC, which was short of aircraft following the grounding of the Comet 1, paid between US$895,000 and US$995,000 per unit and spares for what were essentially five-year-old aircraft. In 1954, an equivalent brand new Douglas DC-7 cost US$775,000 (~$7.16 million in 2024).

Rear cargo loading bay-doors of the Boeing 377.

Boeing set the never-exceed speed at 351 mph (305 kn; 565 km/h) IAS but in testing, the 377 reached 409 mph (355 kn; 658 km/h) IAS (about 500 mph (430 kn; 800 km/h) TAS) in a 15–20 degree dive at 13,500 ft (4,100 m); another report said it reached 498 mph (801 km/h) true airspeed while diving from 21,000 feet (6,400 m) altitude to 12,000 feet (3,700 m) in 50 seconds using "full rated power". Typical airline cruise was less than 300 mph (260 kn; 480 km/h); in August 1953, Pan Am and United 377s (and United DC-6s) were scheduled between Honolulu and San Francisco (2,398 mi (3,859 km)) in 9 h 45 min each way.

The longest (by distance) 377 nonstop flights were made by Pan Am from Tokyo to Honolulu during four winter seasons beginning in 1952–1953. In January 1953, two nonstops a week were scheduled with a flight time of 11 hr 1 min due to tailwinds; the following August all flights took 19 hours, with a stop at Wake Island Airfield. In winter 1953-54, one Tokyo-Honolulu flight took 9 hr 35 min for 3,853 great-circle miles (6,201 km).

Upper-deck stairwell connecting to lower-deck lounge.

By 1960, Stratocruisers were being superseded by jets: the de Havilland Comet, Boeing 707, and Douglas DC-8. The last flight of the 377 with United was in 1954, the last with BOAC was in 1959, and the last with Northwest was in September 1960. In November 1960, only a weekly Pan Am Honolulu to Singapore flight remained, and the 377 was retired by Pan Am in 1961. High operating costs (notably the fuel consumption and maintenance of the Wasp Major engines) led to rapid abandonment of the 377 with the onset of the jet era. Its contemporaries such as the Douglas DC-6 and the Lockheed Constellation continued longer, on secondary routes or rebuilt as freighters. A few 377s were sold to smaller airlines, used as freighters, or converted by Aero Spacelines into heavily modified enlarged freighters called Guppies.

During 1959 and 1960, Transocean Air Lines (TAL) assembled a fleet of fourteen at bargain prices. In 1960, TAL went bankrupt and only four were in operable condition. The hulks were stored at Oakland International Airport through the 1960s and cannibalized for parts, contributing some to the Aero Spacelines Guppies. Five remaining 377s were modified by Bedek Aviation to resemble former U.S. Air Force Model 367 Stratofreighters and pressed into service with the Israel Defense Forces. Two were shot down during the course of their service and the three remaining 377Ms were retired in 1978 and later scrapped. None of the 56 377s built were preserved for display in original condition, although one airframe remains today as the Mini Guppy; the IAF Museum in Israel has a C-97 (4X-FPM) on display painted to resemble their most famous 377M, Masada.

== Variants ==
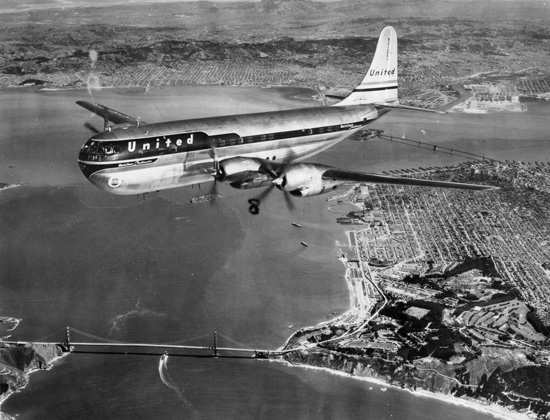
A United Airlines 377 over the Golden Gate Bridge

377-1
Proposed variant to be powered by Wright R-3350 Duplex-Cyclone engines. It was to be fitted with the flaps and deicing boots from the B-29.
377-6
Proposed variant to be powered by supercharged Allison V-3420 engines.
377-10-19
Prototype Stratocruiser; one built. Later brought up to 377-10-26 standard and sold to Pan American World Airways in 1950.
377-10-26
Variant built for Pan American World Airways with round windows. 20 new aircraft built, plus one converted from the 377-10-19 prototype.
377-10-26S Super Stratocruiser
10 refitted with more powerful engines and a larger fuel capacity for Pan American transatlantic flights.
377-10-27
Variant intended for Transcontinental & Western Air, but not built.
377-10-28
Four ordered by the Scandinavian Airlines System, but taken up by BOAC after SAS canceled the order. Aircraft had circular windows and extra deluxe interior appointments, which differed with each aircraft.
377-10-29
Eight delivered to American Overseas Airlines with round windows for the main cabin and rectangular windows for the lower cabin.
377-10-30
Ten for Northwest Orient Airlines with all rectangular windows. The aircraft were eventually fitted with weather radomes similar to the C-97A.
377-10-32
Six for the British Overseas Airways Corporation (BOAC). All cabin windows were circular.
377-10-34

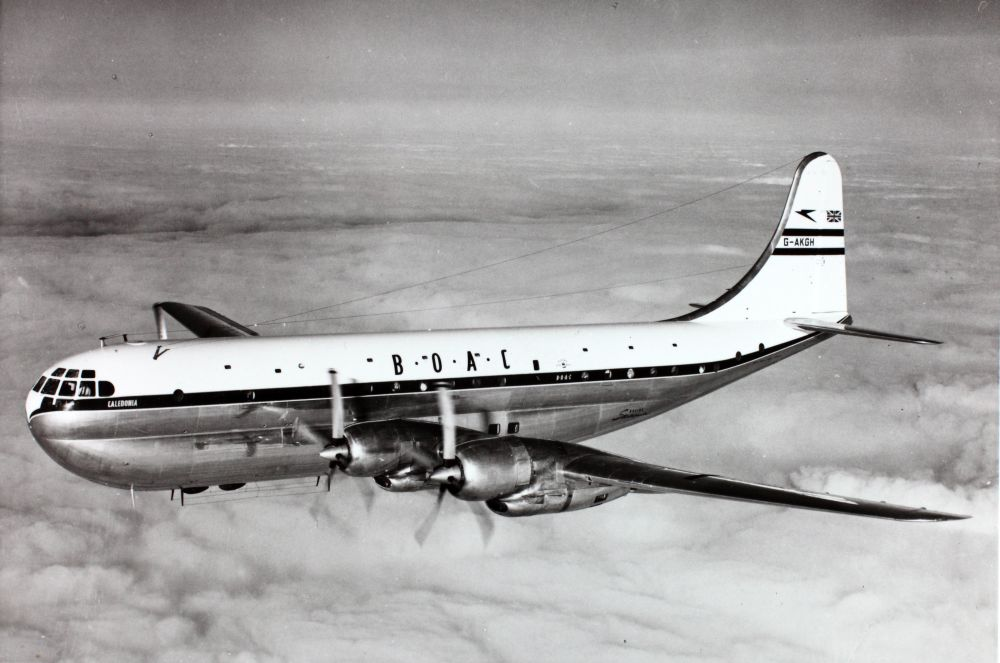
A BOAC Stratocruiser

Seven for United Air Lines. Rectangular windows on the main cabin and circular windows on the lower cabin. Six aircraft were later sold to BOAC.
377-10-40
Proposed variant for domestic flights with high-density seating. Was to be offered in a 105-seat "A" configuration or a 104-seat "B" configuration, both with only two lavatories and no galley.
377-11
Proposed variant to be powered by Wright XA-395 turbine engines.
377-17-39
Proposed variant for Cubana de Aviación to be powered by four Allison XT40-A-6 turboprop engines, each driving two three-bladed contra-rotating propellers. The fuselage was to be stretched by 80 in (200 cm) forward and 40 in (100 cm) aft of the wing, and the gross weigh would have been increased to 153,000 lb (69,000 kg). 133 or 137 passengers would have been seated in an ultra-high density configuration.
377-28-26
Proposed six-engined variant for Pan American World Airways. It was to be powered by two Wright R-1820 Cyclone engines mounted outboard of the four standard R-4360s, and it would have carried two external fuel tanks from the B-50. Seating would have been identical to that of the 377-10-26.
377-212
Proposed variant with a twin-deck all-economy cabin configuration. The main deck was to seat 72 passengers, while the lounge deck would have been offered in a 22-seat "A" configuration or a 14-seat "B" configuration.
377F
Freighter conversion.
377M

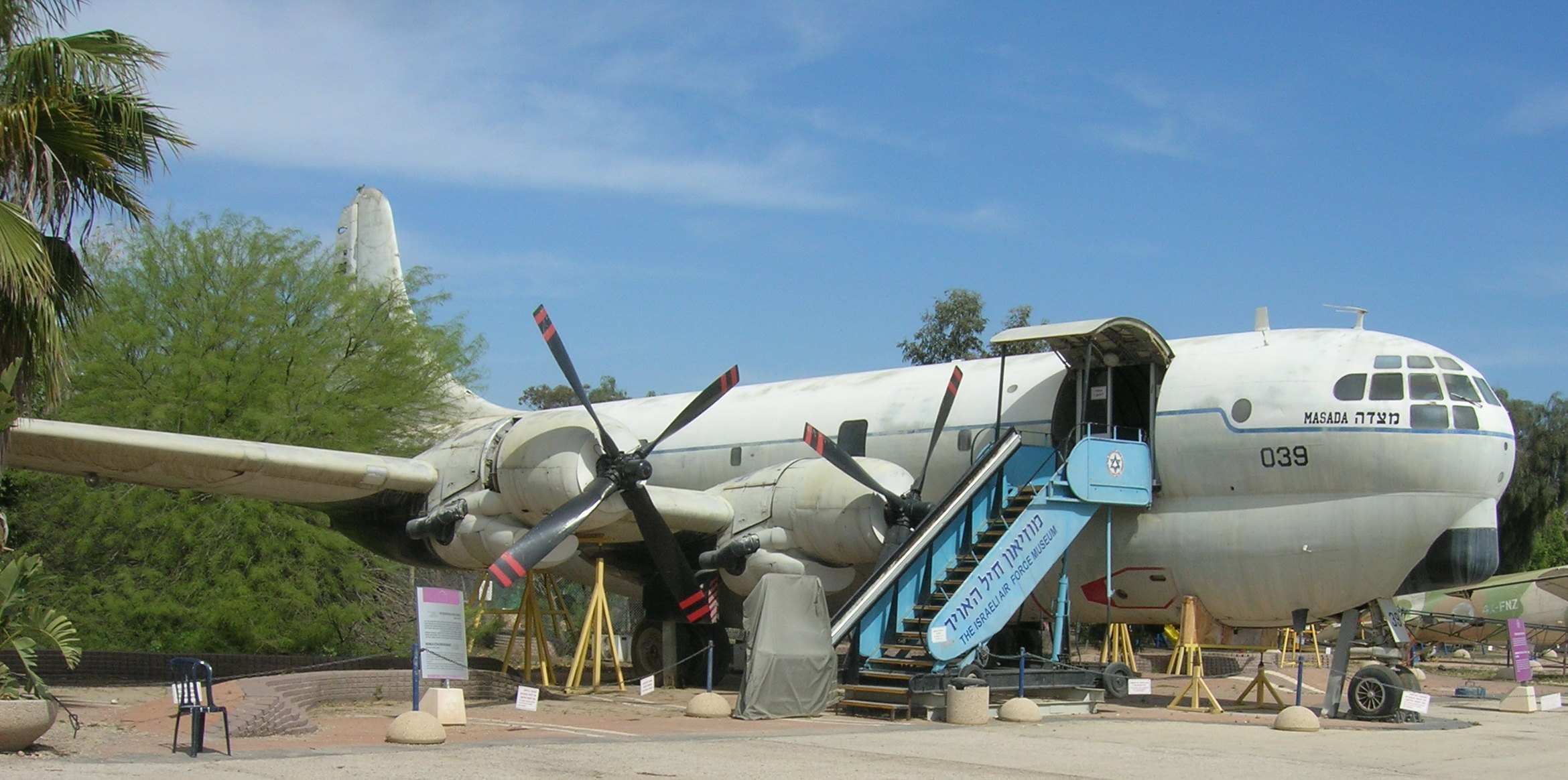
C-97 painted to represent a 377M Anak, Israeli Air Force Museum (2007)

In the early 1960s, the Israeli Air Force wanted to upgrade to the C-130 Hercules, which could lift larger payloads, but it was expensive and sales were embargoed by the United States. Israel Aircraft Industries at Ben Gurion International Airport offered to modify Boeing 377 Stratocruisers. It had a stronger cabin floor which could handle cargo, plus a C-97 military Stratocruiser tail section, which included a clamshell cargo door. These were dubbed Anak (or Giant in Hebrew) and entered service in 1964. Three of these were modified by the use of a swing tail section, similar to the Canadair CL44D-4 airliner. Two others served as aerial tankers with underwing hose reel refueling pods. Two others were ELINT-platforms for electronic reconnaissance, surveillance and electronic countermeasure (ECM) missions. These were later joined by four KC-97Gs with the flying boom system.

=== Aero Spacelines Guppy ===
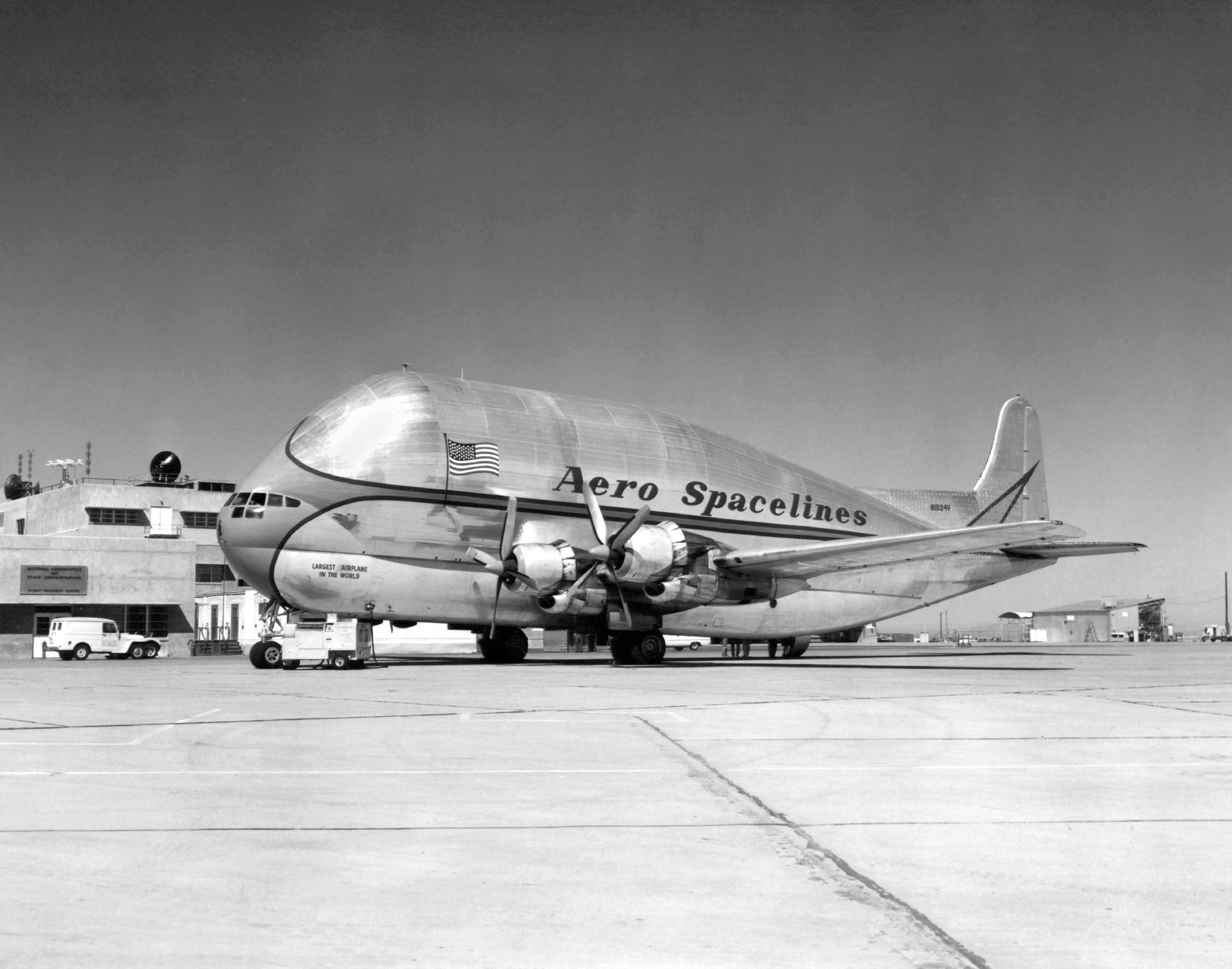
The Pregnant Guppy heavy lifter

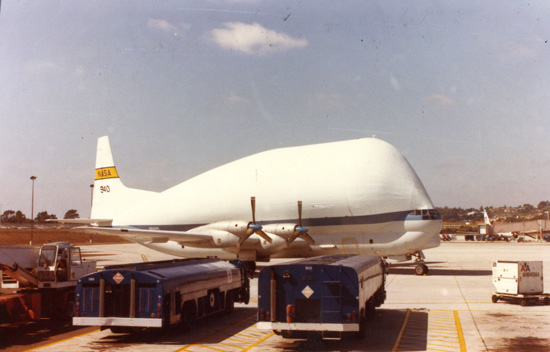
The turbine-powered Super Guppy of NASA

In addition to the Israeli Anaks, a company called Aero Spacelines was converting old 377s to aircraft called Guppies in the 1960s. There were three types: the Pregnant Guppy, Super Guppy, and Mini Guppy. They had an extension to the top of the fuselage to enable them to carry large aircraft parts between manufacturing sites.

The first was the Pregnant Guppy, followed by the Super Guppy, and finally the Mini Guppy. The Super Guppy and the Mini Guppy had turboprop engines.

Aero Spacelines 377PG Pregnant Guppy
Conversion of one 377-10-26, incorporating an enlarged upper deck and a fuselage lengthened by 16 feet to carry sections of the Saturn V rocket. One converted.
Aero Spacelines 377SG Super Guppy
A single heavy-lift transport similar to the Pregnant Guppy built by Aero Spacelines. The aircraft contained parts of a YC-97J Stratofreighter and a 377-10-26 mated with a larger main fuselage, larger tail and Pratt & Whitney T34 turboprops.
Aero Spacelines 201 Super Guppy Turbine
Originally designated the 377SGT, it was similar to the 377SG, but with a more aerodynamic fuselage, a Boeing 707 nosewheel, wingspan stretched by 23 feet (7.0 m), and four Allison 501-D22C turboprops. Four were built and were used by Airbus to carry aircraft parts between its factories. In the 1990s, Airbus retired them due to rising operational costs and they have been replaced with Airbus Belugas. Two of the former Airbus Industrie Super Guppies remain in Germany and France, with a third being scrapped in December 2020 after eleven years of restoration at Bruntingthorpe Aerodrome in the UK. The fourth aircraft was acquired by NASA as part of a barter agreement with ESA for its role as a partner with the International Space Station.

Aero Spacelines 377MG Mini Guppy
Conversion of a 377-10-26, it featured a larger main cabin for oversize cargo, stretched wing and a hinged tail.
Aero Spacelines 101 Mini Guppy Turbine
Originally designated the 377MGT. Similar to the 377MG, but powered by Pratt & Whitney T34-PWA turboprop engines. Two built.

== Operators ==
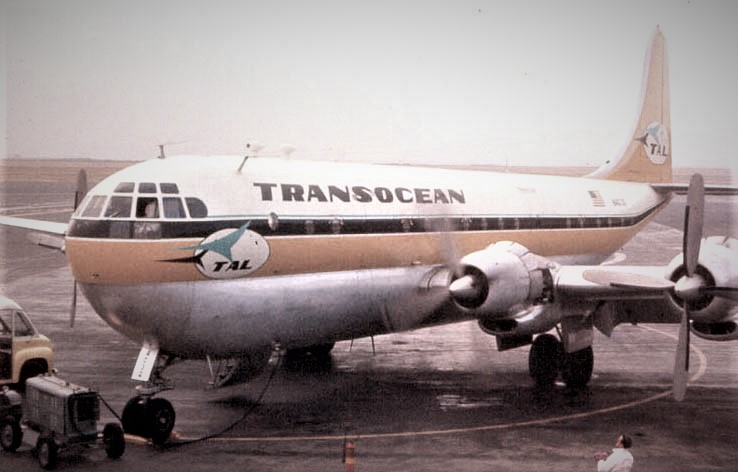
Transocean Air Lines

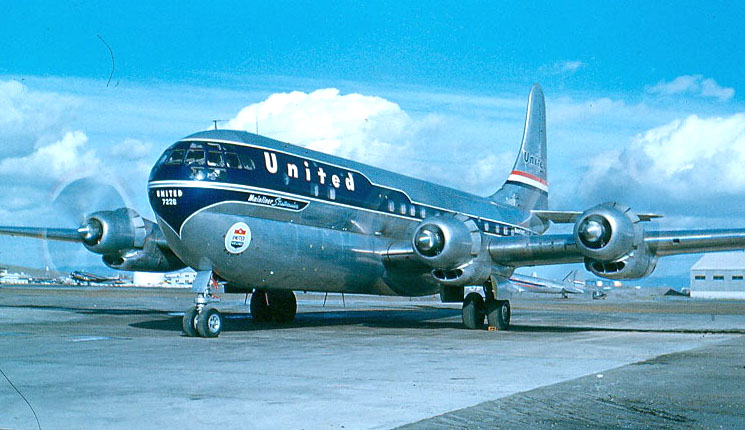
United Airlines

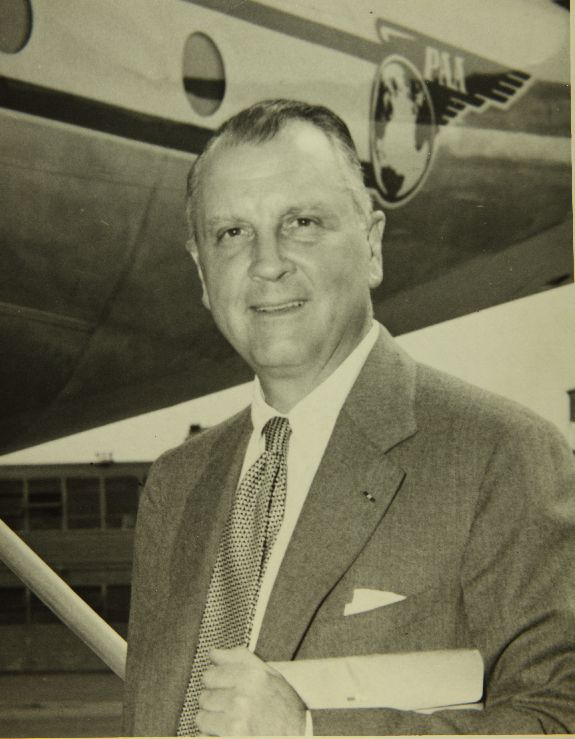
Pan Am President Juan Trippe in front of a 377

Ecuador

- Línea Internacional Aérea

Ghana

- Ghana Airways (Leased from BOAC)

United Kingdom

- British Overseas Airways Corporation (BOAC)

Israel

- Israeli Air Force

Nigeria

- Nigeria Airways (Leased from BOAC)

Sweden

- Svensk Interkontinental Lufttrafik, part of Scandinavian Airlines System (aircraft not delivered - passed to BOAC)

United States

- American Overseas Airlines
- Northwest Orient Airlines
- Pan American World Airways
- Transocean Air Lines
- United Airlines

Venezuela

- Rutas Aéreas Nacionales SA

== Accidents and incidents ==
This aircraft type suffered 13 hull-loss accidents between 1951 and 1970 with a total of 139 fatalities. The worst single accident occurred on 29 April 1952. The aircraft type also experienced a significantly high rate of in-flight emergencies related to engine and propeller failure, resulting in airworthiness directives.

Faults included structural failures of neoprene-cored propellers, failures of propeller pitch control resulting in overspeed, and failures related to engine cooling. Six propeller failures between 1950 and 1955 resulted in separation or near-separation of engines from mounts, with two resulting in hull-loss accidents. Directives were issued in 1950, 1955, and 1958 regarding enhanced maintenance and fault detection, in-flight vibration monitoring, and propeller replacement.

A directive concerning the pitch control system was issued after the 16 October 1956, hull-loss accident. A June 1957 overspeed incident occurred on Romance of the Skies, after the compliance date of the Directive and less than six months before its fatal accident of 8 November 1957. No hull-loss accidents after the loss of the Romance have been attributed to an overspeed incident.

12 September 1951
United Air Lines Flight 7030, a Stratocruiser 10-34 (N31230, named Mainliner Oahu), was being used for a semi-annual instrument check of a captain. At 11:39 PDT, the flight was cleared for an ILS approach to the San Francisco Airport. The aircraft, with No. 4 propeller feathered, stalled and abruptly dived from an altitude of approximately 300 feet and was destroyed upon impact in San Francisco Bay. All three crew aboard were killed. The probable cause was an inadvertent stall at low altitude.
29 April 1952
Pan Am Flight 202, a Stratocruiser 10-26 (N1039V, named Clipper Boa Esperança aka Clipper Good Hope) en route from Buenos Aires-Ezeiza and Rio de Janeiro–Galeão to New York via Port of Spain crashed in the jungle in the south of the State of Pará. Probable causes are the separation of the second engine and propeller from the aircraft due to highly unbalanced forces followed by uncontrollability and disintegration of the aircraft. All 50 passengers and crew died in the worst-ever accident involving the Boeing 377.
27 July 1952
Pan Am Flight 201, a Stratocruiser 10-26 (N1030V) en route from New York and Rio de Janeiro-Galeão to Buenos Aires-Ezeiza suffered explosive decompression at about 12,000 feet about 20 miles south of Rio de Janeiro. A passenger was blown out and the cabin considerably damaged, but the aircraft was able to return to Rio de Janeiro and make a safe landing. The main cabin door had not been properly locked.
25 December 1954
A BOAC Stratocruiser 10-28 (G-ALSA, named RMA Cathay) crashed on landing at Prestwick at 0330 hours, killing 28 of the 36 passengers and crew on board. The aircraft had been en route from London to New York City, when, on approach to Prestwick, it entered a steep descent before leveling-out too late and too severely, hitting the ground short of the runway.
26 March 1955
Pan Am Flight 845/26, a Stratocruiser 10-26 (N1032V, named Clipper United States), ditched 35 miles (56 km) off the Oregon coast after the no. 3 engine and propeller tore loose from the wing, causing severe control difficulties. The aircraft sank after 20 minutes in water of about 1,600 m (5,200 ft) depth. There were four fatalities out of the 23 occupants, including two of the crew.
2 April 1956
Northwest Orient Airlines Flight 2, a Stratocruiser 10-30 (N74608, named Stratocruiser Tokyo), ditched into Puget Sound after the flight engineer mistakenly failed to close the cowl flaps on the plane's engines, an error attributed to confusing instrument layout. Although all aboard escaped the aircraft after a textbook ditching, four passengers and one flight attendant succumbed either to drowning or to hypothermia before being rescued.
16 October 1956

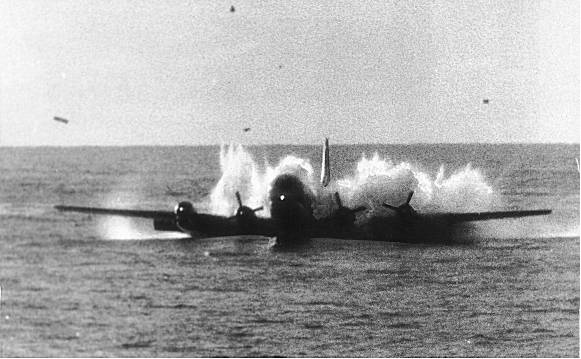
Pan Am Flight 6 ditches near Hawaii

Pan Am Flight 6, a Stratocruiser 10-29 (N90943, named Clipper Sovereign of the Skies), ditched northeast of Hawaii during the last leg of an around-the-world flight from Philadelphia to San Francisco after two of its four engines failed following an overspeed incident. The aircraft was able to circle around USCG Pontchartrain until daybreak, when it ditched; all 31 on board survived.
8 November 1957
Pan Am Flight 7, a Stratocruiser 10-29 (registered N90944, named Clipper Romance of the Skies), left San Francisco for Hawaii with 38 passengers and six crew. The 377 crashed around 5:25 p.m. in the Pacific Ocean. There were no survivors and the entire wreckage has never been found. Only 19 bodies and bits of debris were recovered. There is speculation that two passengers had a motive to bring the plane down. Eugene Crosthwaite, a 46-year-old purser, had shown blasting powder to a relative days prior to the flight, and had cut a stepdaughter from his will only one hour before the flight. Pan Am concluded that there was sufficient evidence that Crosthwaite was the culprit. William Payne, an ex-Navy demolitions expert, had taken out large insurance policies on himself just before the flight, and had a $10,000 debt he was desperate to pay off. The insurance investigator later suspected him of never being on the plane. His wife received at least $125,000 in payouts. It was the opinion of the flight engineer during the Sovereign incident, and a pilot who had experienced an overspeed on the Romance less than six months before its loss, that an overspeed was a likely cause of the crash. The overspeed theory calls into question whether Pan Am was in compliance with an Airworthiness Directive concerning a weakness in the pitch control system, issued in response to the Sovereign incident the previous year.
2 June 1958
A Pan Am Stratocruiser 10-26 (registration N1023V, named Clipper Golden Gate) was on a flight from San Francisco to Singapore via several intermediate stops. As the aircraft touched down at Manila (runway 06) in a heavy landing in rainy and gusty conditions, the undercarriage collapsed as a result of the hard landing. The plane skidded and swerved to the right, coming to rest 2,850 feet past the runway threshold and 27 feet from the edge of the runway. One of the passengers was killed when one of the blades of the number 3 propeller broke off, penetrating the passenger cabin.
10 April 1959
At the conclusion of a flight from Seattle to Juneau, Alaska, a Pan Am Stratocruiser 10-26 (N1033V, named Clipper Midnight Sun) undershot on final approach and collided with an embankment. The aircraft caught fire and was destroyed, but all 10 passengers and crew survived.
9 July 1959
A Pan Am Boeing Stratocruiser 10-29 (N90941, named Clipper Australia) belly landed at Haneda Airport following landing gear problems; all 59 passengers and crew on board survived, but the aircraft was written off.
August 1967
An Aero Spacelines Stratocruiser 10-29 (N90942) suffered a ground collision with Stratocruiser 10-32 N402Q at Mojave, California; the aircraft was damaged beyond repair.
12 May 1970
An Aero Spacelines 377MGT (N111AS) was being test flown following conversion from a Boeing 377. During the sixth takeoff with one engine shut down, the aircraft turned and rolled to the left. The left wingtip then struck the ground and the aircraft yawed severely after which the forward fuselage struck the ground, destroying the cockpit. All four crew died.

== Specifications (377) ==
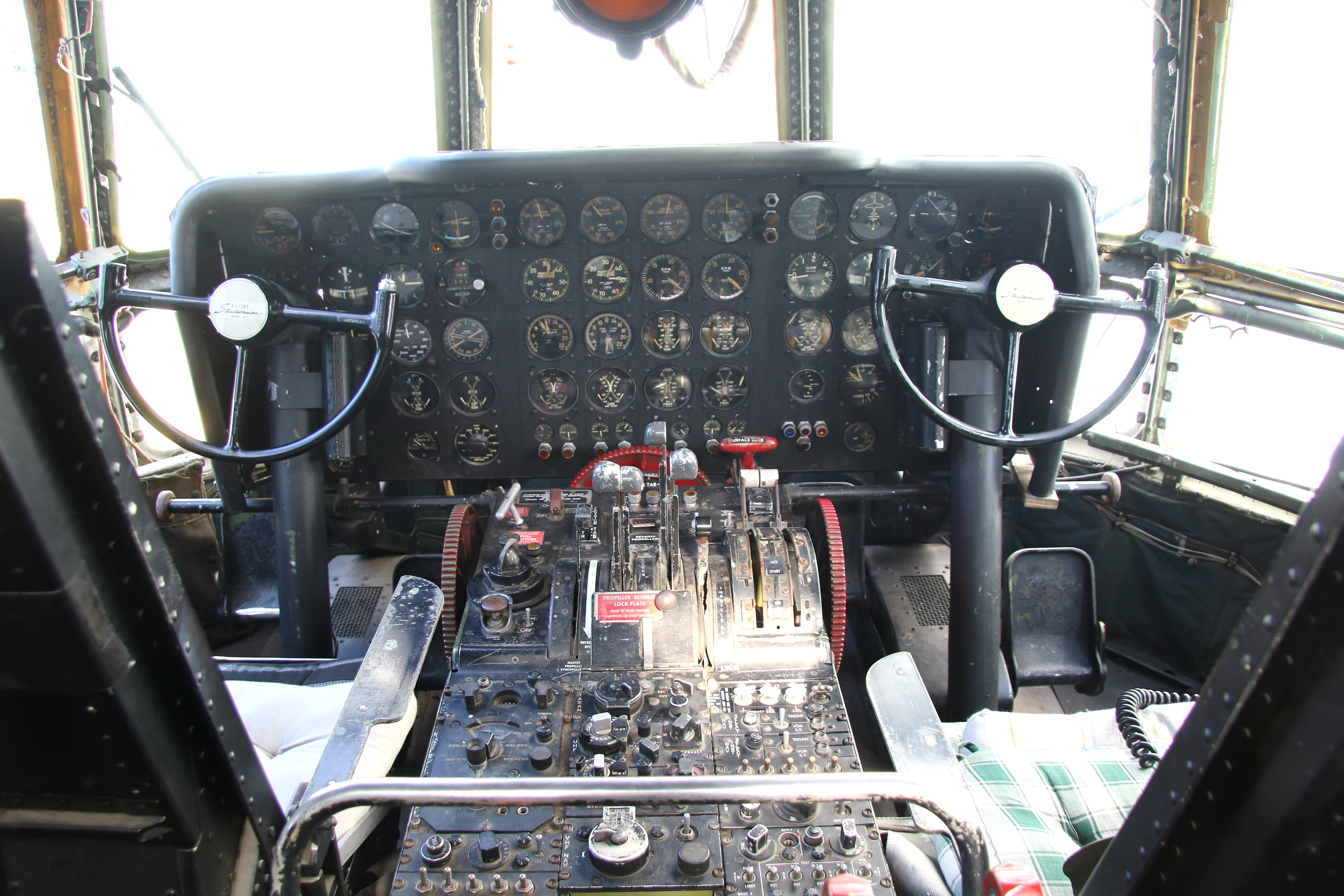
Cockpit of a Boeing 377.

Data from Airliners of the World

General characteristics

- Crew: 4 flight crew (captain, first officer, flight engineer, navigator) + 2-3 cabin crew
- Capacity: Up to 100 passengers on main deck plus 14 in lower deck lounge; typical seating for 63 or 84 passengers or 28 berthed and five seated passengers.
- Length: 110 ft 4 in (33.63 m)
- Wingspan: 141 ft 3 in (43.05 m)
- Height: 38 ft 3 in (11.66 m)
- Wing area: 1,769 sq ft (164.3 m^{2})
- Empty weight: 83,500 lb (37,875 kg)
- Max takeoff weight: 148,000 lb (67,132 kg)
- Powerplant: 4 × Pratt & Whitney R-4360-B6 Wasp Major 28-cylinder air-cooled radial piston engines, 3,500 hp (2,600 kW) each
- Propellers: 4-bladed constant-speed fully-feathering propellers

Performance

- Maximum speed: 375 mph (604 km/h, 326 kn)
- Cruise speed: 301 mph (484 km/h, 262 kn)
- Range: 4,200 mi (6,800 km, 3,600 nmi)
- Service ceiling: 32,000 ft (9,800 m)

== See also ==
Related development

- Aero Spacelines Pregnant Guppy – Outsize cargo conversion of the Boeing 377 Stratocruiser
- Aero Spacelines Super Guppy – Larger turboprop version of outsize cargo aircraft Pregnant Guppy
- Aero Spacelines Mini Guppy – Wide-bodied cargo aircraft
- Boeing B-50 Superfortress – Piston-engined strategic bomber aircraft family, 1947
- Boeing C-97 Stratofreighter – Long-range heavy military cargo aircraft built 1944–1952
- Boeing KC-97 Stratofreighter – 1951–1978 American strategic tanker aircraft

Aircraft of comparable role, configuration, and era

- Canadair CL-44 – Canadian turboprop airliner (1950s–60s)
- Boeing B-29 Superfortress – US heavy bomber aircraft (1944–1960)
- Douglas DC-7 – US airliner with 4 piston engines, 1953
- Lockheed L-188 Electra – American turboprop airliner, built 1957–1961
- Lockheed Constellation – Family of US airliners with 4 piston engines, 1943
- Lockheed L-049 Constellation – US airliner with 4 piston engines, 1943
- Lockheed L-649 Constellation – US airliner with 4 piston engines, 1946
- Lockheed L-749 Constellation – First version of Constellation with the ability to cross the Atlantic non-stop
- Lockheed L-1049 Super Constellation – US airliner with 4 piston engines, 1951
- Lockheed L-1649 Starliner – US airliner with 4 piston engines, 1956
- Lockheed R6V Constitution – Transport aircraft
- Tupolev Tu-70 – Prototype airliner variant of Tu-4 bomber
