= 1954 BOAC Boeing 377 crash =

Aviation incident that occurred on Christmas Day, 1954

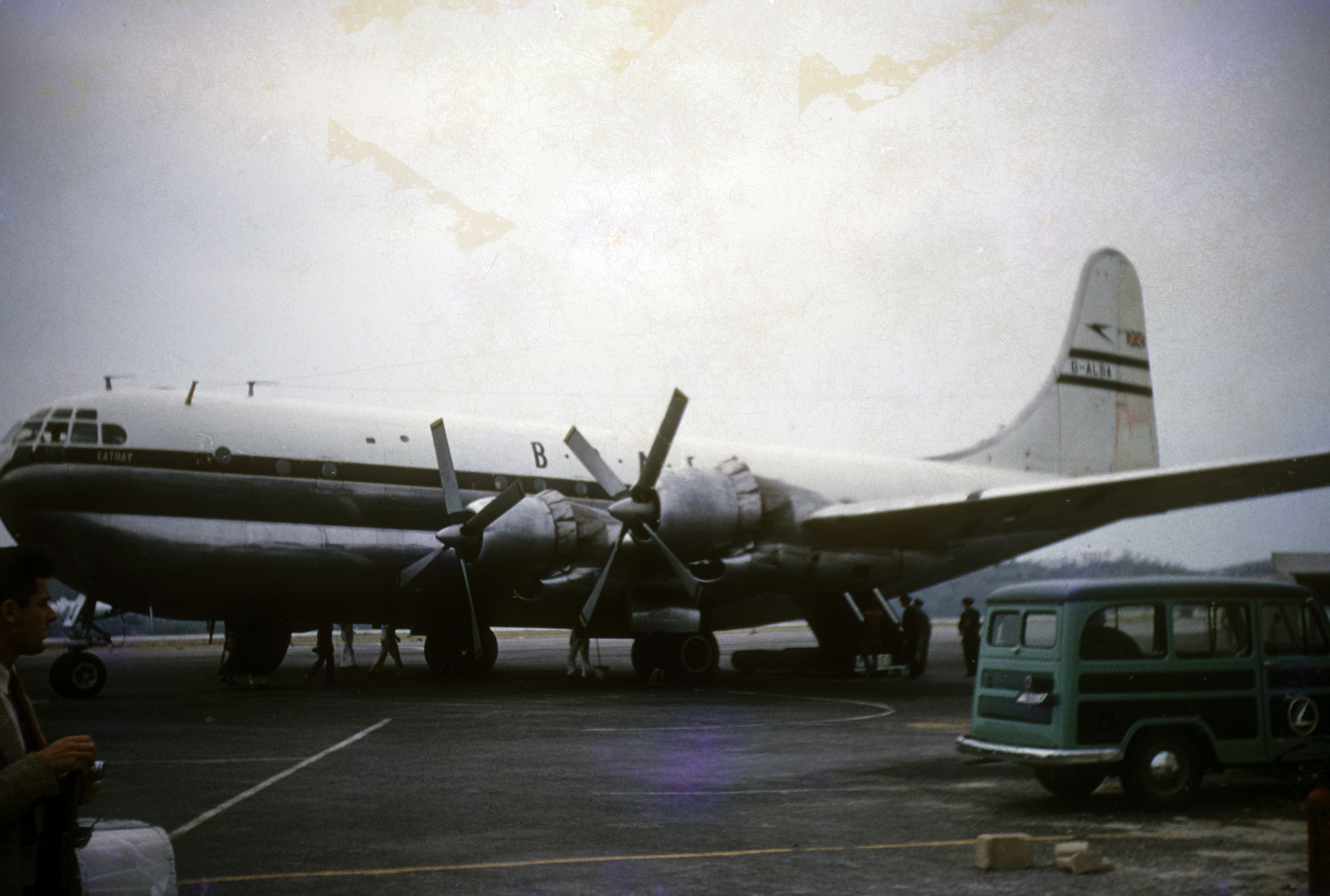
- G-ALSA, the aircraft involved the accident, photographed in 1953

Accident
- Date: 25 December 1954
- Summary: Pilot error
- Site: Prestwick Airport, Scotland; 55°30′07″N 4°34′24″W

Aircraft
- Aircraft type: Boeing 377 Stratocruiser
- Aircraft name: RMA Cathay
- Operator: British Overseas Airways Corporation
- Registration: G-ALSA
- Flight origin: London Heathrow Airport
- Stopover: Manchester Airport, Lancashire
- 2nd stopover: Prestwick Airport, South Ayrshire
- Destination: Idlewild Airport, New York City, United States
- Occupants: 36
- Passengers: 25
- Crew: 11
- Fatalities: 28
- Injuries: 8
- Survivors: 8

On 25 December 1954, a British Overseas Airways Corporation Boeing 377 Stratocruiser crashed on landing at Prestwick Airport, Scotland; 28 of the 36 on board were killed.

== Accident ==
The Stratocruiser was on a flight from Heathrow Airport, England to New York, United States with scheduled stop-overs at Manchester Airport, in Northern England and Prestwick Airport in Scotland. Due to the bad weather it was decided to fly directly to Prestwick and the flight was delayed while it waited for a Manchester passenger to be brought to London. The aircraft originally scheduled to operate the flight left Heathrow at 21:43 GMT but it returned to London at 22:53 with a mechanical problem, the passengers and crew were moved to another aircraft (Cathay) which left for Prestwick at 01:05 on 25 December. Only four of twenty-five passengers were booked onward to New York; the rest were to leave the flight at Prestwick. The eleven crew members were also due to be relieved at Prestwick and be replaced with a new crew.

It was 03:30 in driving rain when Cathay was about to land at Prestwick; it landed short of the runway forcing the port landing gear into the wing causing the aircraft to overturn and burst into flames.

== Diamonds ==
Among the 250 bags of mail cargo was a £900,000 consignment of diamonds for a New York address. A police guard was placed on the crash site and diamonds were still being found at scene a week later. On 5 January it was reported that only 300 diamonds had been found and further searches were to be carried out which included digging up the soil around the crash site. Out of the 40 parcels of diamonds only 90% were recovered.

== Aircraft ==
RMA Cathay was a four-engined Boeing 377-10-28 Stratocruiser airliner, registered G-ALSA. It had been delivered new to BOAC on 12 October 1949. The aircraft was depicted, very briefly, at the beginning of the 1951 film Home to Danger.

== Passengers and crew ==
Twenty-eight people died including ten women and two children. One of the men killed was the cricketer Kenneth Davidson. Of the eight survivors, seven were members of the flight crew who were thrown from the wreckage as it broke apart.

== Investigation and inquiry ==
It was announced on 3 January 1955 by the Minister of Transport that a public enquiry would be held into the accident.

The public inquiry opened at Ayr on 28 March 1955 with questions about the operation of the air brake switch and any possible effect a failure may have caused. On the second day evidence was taken from air traffic controllers who agreed that the aircraft had descended on the runway more rapidly than usual, the inquiry also heard from a pilot of an aircraft that landed before the Stratocruiser about the condition of the airfield and approach lighting.

The inquiry reported on 20 July that the accident was caused by an error of judgement by the pilot and contributed to by the First Officer not turning on the landing lights. It concluded that the accident "was not caused or contributed to by any wrongful act or party and/or mechanical defect in the plane".

The inquiry also made three recommendations:

- '"While finding that there was nothing in the aircrew's tour of duty to cause undue fatigue, the report urges that BOAC should consider some limitations of hours of duty of an aircrew at an airport".
- It urged that internal communications within the Ministry of Civil Aviation should be investigated.
- It also recommended that access points to the aircraft should be better marked and that the use of battery-operated lighting should be considered.
