= Northwest Orient Airlines Flight 2 =

1956 aircraft ditching in Puget Sound

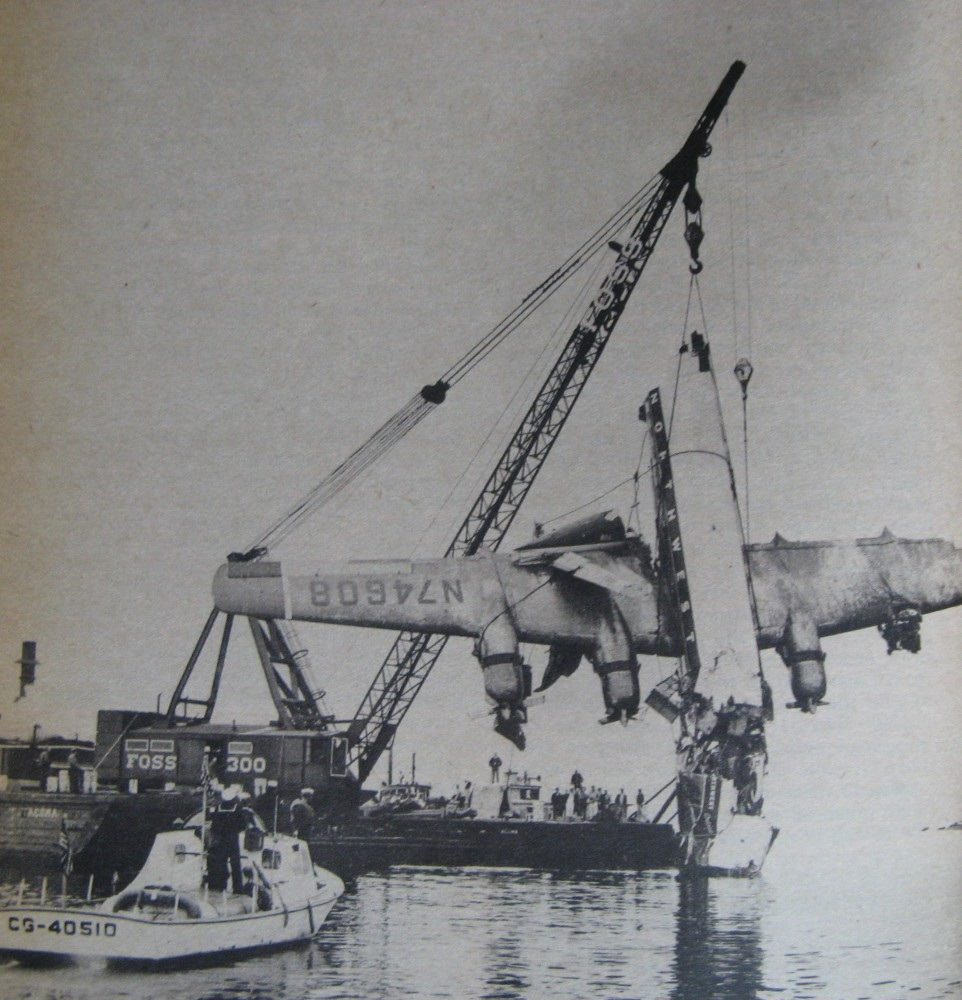
- Wreckage of N74608.

Accident
- Date: April 2, 1956
- Summary: Crew error, water ditching
- Site: Puget Sound, King County, Washington, U.S.; 47.39°N 122.37°W

Aircraft
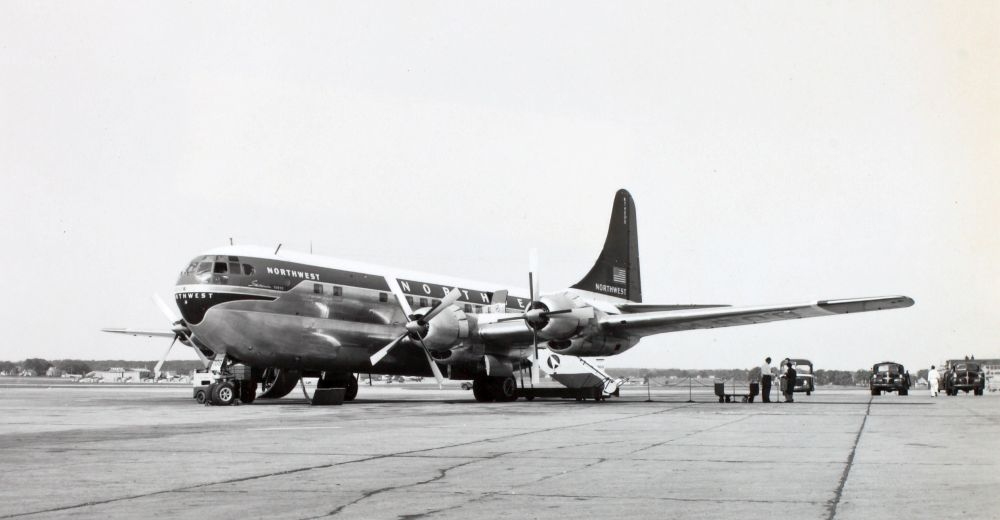
- A Northwest Boeing 377, similar to the accident aircraft
- Aircraft type: Boeing 377-10-30 Stratocruiser
- Aircraft name: Stratocruiser Tokyo
- Operator: Northwest Orient Airlines
- Registration: N74608
- Flight origin: Seattle-Tacoma International Airport
- 1st stopover: Portland International Airport
- 2nd stopover: Chicago, Illinois
- Destination: New York City
- Passengers: 32
- Crew: 6
- Fatalities: 5 (4 passengers, 1 crew)
- Injuries: 2
- Survivors: 33

Northwest Orient Airlines Flight 2 was a Boeing 377 Stratocruiser aircraft that was ditched into Puget Sound, just off Maury Island at the Point Robinson Light, shortly after takeoff from Seattle-Tacoma International Airport on the morning of Monday, April 2, 1956.

The plane flew over Normandy Park heading southwest. All of those aboard survived the ditching and escaped the aircraft before it sank, but four passengers and one flight attendant subsequently died.

== Incident ==
Flight 2 departed Sea-Tac at 08:06 PST on runway 20 (since removed), and its itinerary was south to Portland, then east to Chicago and New York City. The takeoff was uneventful until the first officer (Gene Paul Johnson) retracted the wing flaps; the aircraft suddenly began to buffet violently and also began a roll to the left. The captain (Robert Reeve Heard) believed that an asymmetric wing flap condition—when one set of flaps retract, but the other wing's set of flaps remain extended—had developed and made numerous attempts to control the aircraft, but to no avail.

Believing the aircraft unairworthy, he considered returning to Sea-Tac or diverting to McChord Air Force Base south of Tacoma, but the buffeting worsened and the Stratocruiser began to lose altitude. They decided their best chance was to ditch in the relatively shallow and (on that day) calm waters of Puget Sound. The first officer's Mayday transmission relaying the intention to ditch was heard by the captain of a Coast Guard vessel and the pilot of an Air Force amphibious Grumman Albatross aircraft; both readied to assist the stricken aircraft.

The captain brought the aircraft down smoothly at 08:10, 4.7 nautical miles (8.7 km; 5.4 mi) southwest of the departure runway. Although it took on water quickly, the passenger cabin remained in one piece, and all of those on board were able to depart safely, most using their seat cushions as makeshift flotation devices.

Ten minutes after the ditching, the Air Force Grumman landed in the water nearby and launched a number of inflatable liferafts, but not all passengers and crew were able to reach them; many remained in the 42 °F (6 °C) water of Puget Sound, hanging onto their seat cushions until they were rescued less than thirty minutes later by the Coast Guard vessel. Four passengers, including a six-year-old boy and his mother, and one male flight attendant were not recovered, thought to have succumbed to hypothermia. The Stratocruiser sank fifteen minutes after the ditching in approximately 430 feet (130 m) of water.

== Investigation ==
Investigators with the Civil Aeronautics Board (CAB) determined that the underlying cause of the accident was a single error made by the flight engineer (Vernon Thomsen). Stratocruiser engines were cooled by opening panels called "cowl flaps" or "engine cooling flaps" (also called "cowl gills") which circled the rear part of the engine and allowed heat to dissipate when open. The open cowl flaps could also disrupt the flow of air over the wings and it was therefore necessary to close them during critical phases of flight such as takeoff when maximum lift was needed. When the captain during his pre-takeoff checklist called, "Cowl flaps set for takeoff," the flight engineer replied "Set for takeoff," but had not actually closed them. When the aircraft took off and the wing flaps were retracted, the loss of lift caused by the open engine cowl flaps caused the aircraft wings to partially stall.

Tests performed by CAB investigators showed that a Stratocruiser that took off with all cowl flaps open responded very similarly to a one-engine shut down; the aircraft could be turned and flown for some time before becoming too unstable to remain aloft. However, the captain was convinced that the problem had been caused by asymmetric wing flaps, a situation that would make all but the slightest turn dangerous, and decided to maintain the southwest heading and ditch, based on that analysis.

The CAB found that the captain had incorrectly identified the cause of the aircraft's control and stability problems, but that it was extremely difficult if not impossible for him to have correctly identified the problem given the information available, the nature of the emergency he was faced with, and the time in which he had to make the decision as to whether to ditch or to attempt a landing at McChord AFB or back at Sea-Tac.

The flight engineer was qualified on three different aircraft, but spent most of his time in the other two types (L-1049, DC-6). In the previous ninety days, he had less than two hours in a B-377, during a requalification check two weeks prior. The cockpit cowl flap controls on the B-377 and L-1049 moved in opposite directions for the closing of cowl flaps. At the hearing, the flight engineer testified that it was possible he had moved these controls in the wrong direction prior to takeoff, thus leaving the flaps in their already open position.

== Corporate name ==
The accident flight is known in some references (and in the CAB report) as Northwest Airlines Flight 2; it actually flew under the Northwest Orient Airlines name. Northwest advertised itself as Northwest Orient Airlines from the late 1940s to its merger with Republic Airlines in 1986; the registered corporate name remained "Northwest Airlines", thus the CAB report's designation is correct.

== See also ==
- Aviation safety
- List of accidents and incidents involving commercial aircraft
- Water landing
