= Pan Am Flight 845/26 =

1955 aircraft accident in the Pacific Ocean

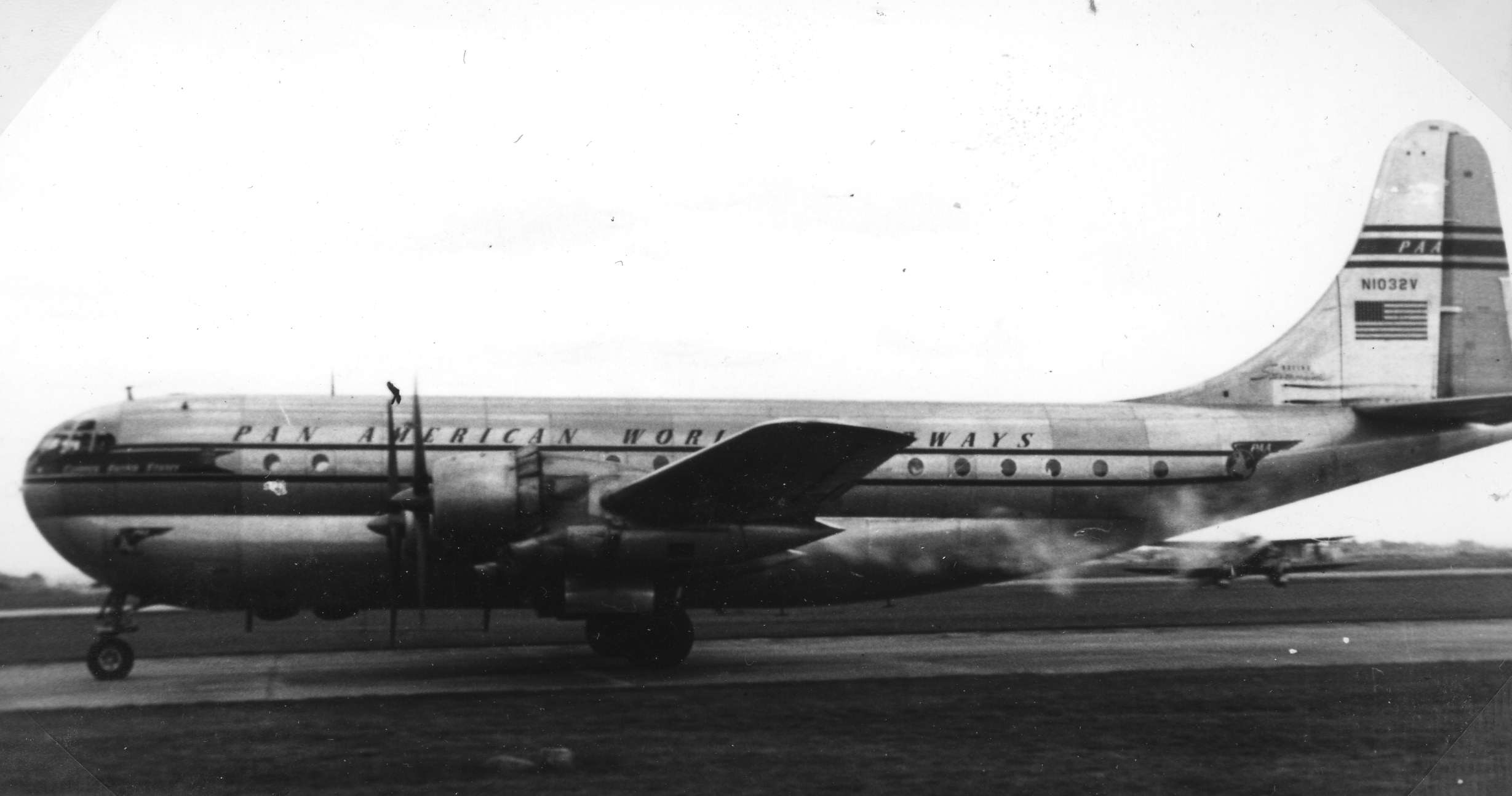
- N1032V, the aircraft involved in the accident

Accident
- Date: 26 March 1955
- Summary: Engine separation, water ditching
- Site: Pacific Ocean 35 miles (56 km) West of Oregon, United States; 43°48′15″N 125°12′40″W

Aircraft
- Aircraft type: Boeing 377 Stratocruiser 10-26
- Aircraft name: Clipper United States
- Operator: Pan American World Airways
- Call sign: CLIPPER 845/26
- Registration: N1032V
- Flight origin: Seattle-Tacoma, Washington
- 1st stopover: Portland International Airport
- 2nd stopover: Honolulu International Airport
- Destination: Sydney, Australia
- Passengers: 15
- Crew: 8
- Fatalities: 4
- Injuries: 19
- Survivors: 19

Pan Am Flight 845/26 was a four-engined Boeing 377 Stratocruiser named Clipper United States and registered as N1032V. It departed Portland International Airport in Oregon on a flight to Honolulu International Airport in Hawaii on 26 March 1955. The aircraft was en route and about 35 miles (56 km) off the Oregon coast when at 11:12 Pacific Standard Time the No. 3 engine and propeller tore loose from the wing causing a loss of control. The aircraft was ditched.

The aircraft floated for twenty minutes before sinking in 1,600 metres (5,200 ft) of water. Approximately two hours after the aircraft ditched, the United States Navy attack transport USS Bayfield (APA-33) arrived on the scene and rescued the 19 survivors. Four people died.

The probable cause was failure of No. 3 propeller which caused the engine to detach and the aircraft to become uncontrollable.

The experience provided lessons that helped prevent any casualties in another ditching the following year, when Pan Am Flight 6 sank between Honolulu and San Francisco.
