= Aero Spacelines Mini Guppy =

Wide-bodied cargo aircraft

Mini Guppy
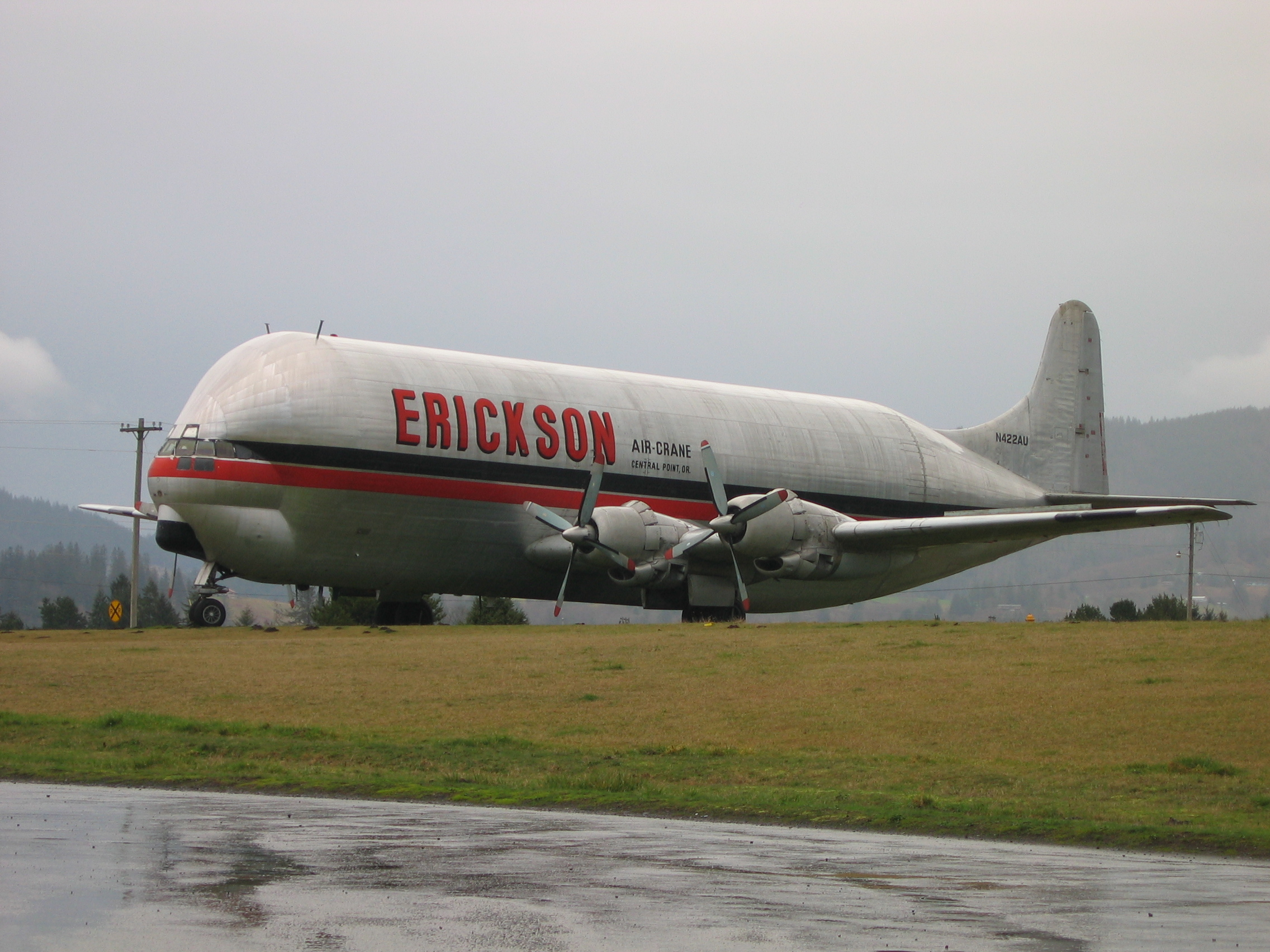
- Mini Guppy at the Tillamook Air Museum in Tillamook, Oregon.

General information
- Type: Outsize cargo freight aircraft
- National origin: United States
- Manufacturer: Aero Spacelines
- Primary users: Aero Spacelines Aero Union; Erickson Inc. American Jet Industries
- Number built: 3 (1 MG, 2 MGT)

History
- First flight: May 24, 1967
- Retired: 1995
- Developed from: Boeing C-97 Stratofreighter; Boeing 377 Stratocruiser

The Aero Spacelines Mini Guppy is a large, wide-bodied, American cargo aircraft used for aerial transport of outsized cargo components. The Mini Guppy is one of the Guppy line of aircraft produced by Aero Spacelines, alongside the Pregnant Guppy and Super Guppy.

== Variants ==
The Mini Guppy was produced in two variants.

=== Mini Guppy ===
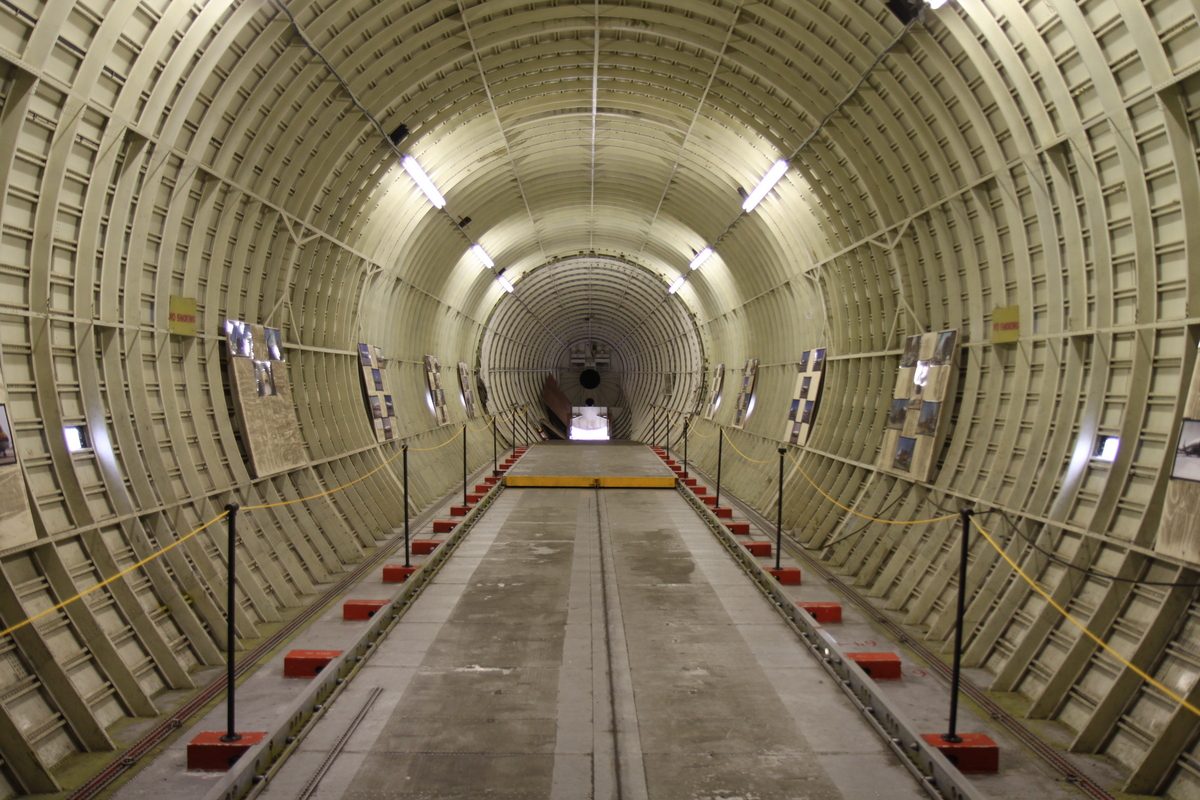
The cargo area of the Mini Guppy

The sole Model 377MG Mini Guppy was converted from a Boeing 377-10-26 (c/n 15937) and registered N1037V. An entirely new fuselage was fitted to the aircraft with a cargo bay measuring 73 ft (22 m) long and 18 ft (5.5 m) wide with a 13 ft (4.0 m) cargo floor; smaller than the cargo bay of the preceding Pregnant Guppy. Cargo was loaded through a hinged swinging tail. It retained the Pratt & Whitney R-4360 engines of the Stratocruiser, though provisions were made for the installation of Allison 501 turboprop engines. The vertical tail was extended by 80 in (200 cm), while a new wing center section increased the wingspan by 15 ft (4.6 m). The Mini Guppy's empty weight was 90,000 lb (41,000 kg).

=== Mini Guppy Turbine ===
Two further Mini Guppies were built from parts of several Boeing 377 and C-97 aircraft, registered N111AS (c/n 0001) and N112AS (c/n 0002). (Note: Some sources state that only one Mini Guppy Turbine was built.) Known as the Model 101 Mini Guppy Turbine, these aircraft differed from the original Mini Guppy in that they were powered by four 5,700 shp (4,300 kW) Pratt & Whitney T34-PWA turboprop engines and that cargo was loaded through a swinging nose section.

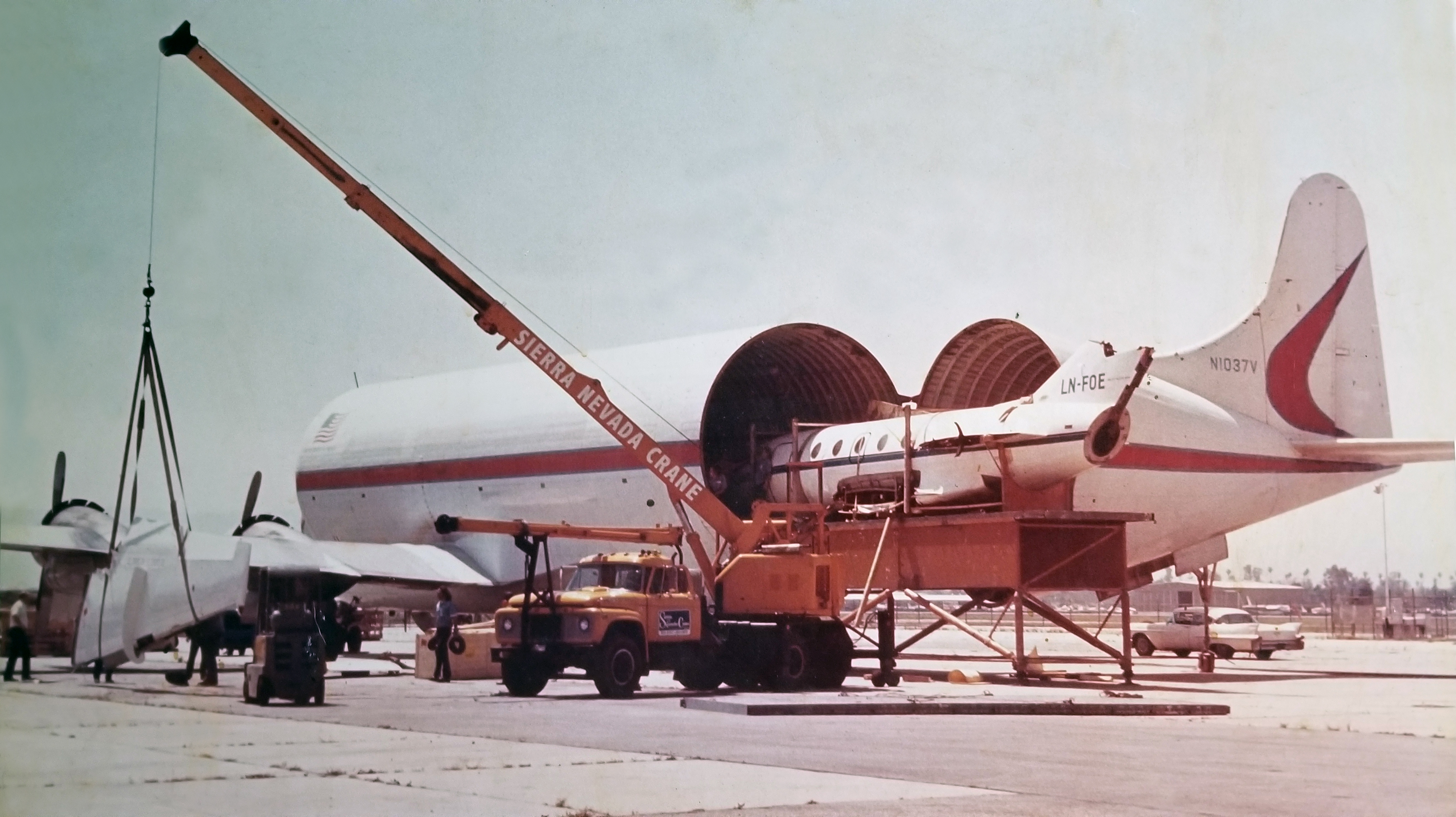
Aero Spacelines Mini Guppy transporting a salvaged Dassault Falcon 20C.

== Operational history ==
Mini Guppy N1037V made its first flight on May 24, 1967, and was displayed at the that year's Paris Air Show. In 1969, N1037V ferried parts to repair a Boeing 707 that had been damaged in a hijacking in Damascus. In 1972, N1037V was used to transport Pioneer 10 to Cape Canaveral and the Goodyear GZ-20 Europa from Akron Municipal Airport to Cardington Airfield, becoming the largest aircraft to fly out of Akron. American Jet Industries acquired the aircraft in 1974 and operated it as N422AU. N422AU was subsequently sold to Aero Union in 1980 and Erickson Inc. in 1988 before being retired to the Tillamook Air Museum in 1995.

N111AS first took to the air on May 1, 1970, but was short-lived. On May 12, 1970, N111AS crashed during its twelfth test flight at Edwards Air Force Base, California, killing all four onboard crew members. The aircraft was performing a planned three-engine takeoff when it rolled and turned. The left wingtip struck the ground followed by the forward fuselage, destroying the flight deck.

The FAA registration for N112AS was canceled on October 9, 1975.

== Aircraft on display ==
Mini Guppy N422AU is on display at Tillamook Air Museum. In 2014, the museum announced that it planned to transfer its aircraft collection to Madras, Oregon, which would require the Mini Guppy to be restored to airworthy condition and flown to the new location. A new airworthiness certificate was issued for N422AU in January 2017.

== Specifications (377MG Mini Guppy) ==
Data from Janes All the World's Aircraft 1971–1972, FAA type certificate

General characteristics

- Crew: 4
- Capacity: 32,000 lb (15,000 kg)
- Length: 132 ft 10 in (40.49 m)
- Wingspan: 156 ft 3 in (47.63 m)
- Height: 38 ft 3 in (11.66 m)
- Max takeoff weight: 142,800 lb (64,770 kg)
- Fuel capacity: 6,580 US gal (24,900 L; 5,480 imp gal) usable
- Powerplant: 4 × Pratt & Whitney R-4360-B6 Wasp Major 28-cylinder four-row radial engines, 3,500 hp (2,600 kW) each
- Propellers: 4-bladed Hamilton Standard Model 34E60-349, 16 ft (4.9 m) diameter

Performance

- Cruise speed: 240 mph (386 km/h, 208 kn)
- Service ceiling: 20,000 ft (6,100 m)

== See also ==
Related development

- Boeing B-29 Superfortress
- Boeing 377 Stratocruiser
- Aero Spacelines Pregnant Guppy
- Aero Spacelines Super Guppy

Aircraft of comparable role, configuration, and era

- Airbus Beluga
- Boeing Dreamlifter
- Conroy Skymonster
- Myasishchev VM-T

== Bibliography ==
- Taylor, H. A. "Tony" (April–July 1982). "Stratocruiser... Ending an Airline Era". Air Enthusiast. No. 18. pp. 37–53. ISSN 0143-5450.
