= Aero Spacelines =

1960s aircraft manufacturer in the United States

Aero Spacelines, Inc.
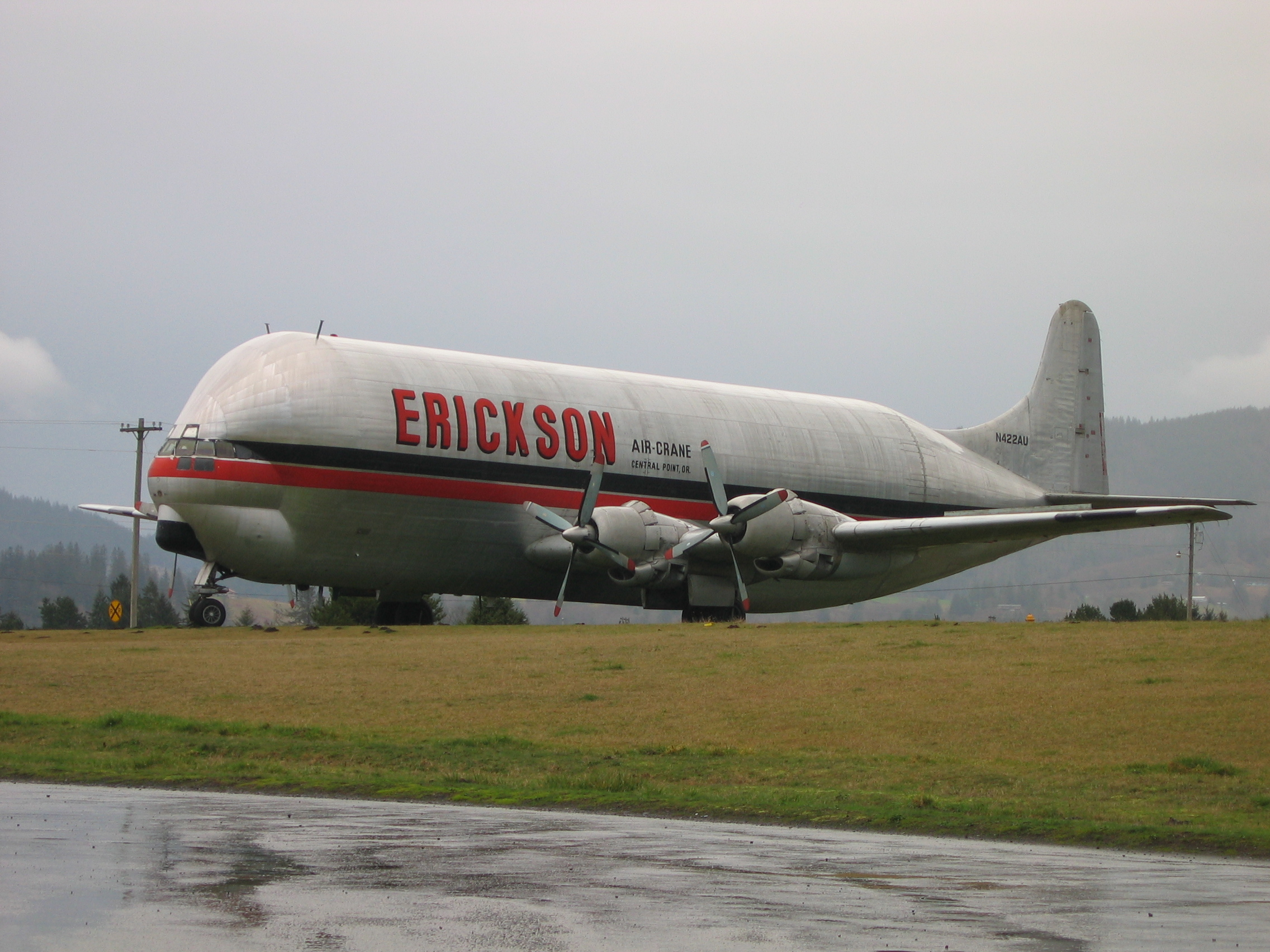
- An Aero Spacelines Mini Guppy at the Tillamook Air Museum in Tillamook, Oregon
- Founded: 1960
- Founder: John M. Conroy
- Defunct: 1981
- Products: Pregnant Guppy; Super Guppy; Mini Guppy

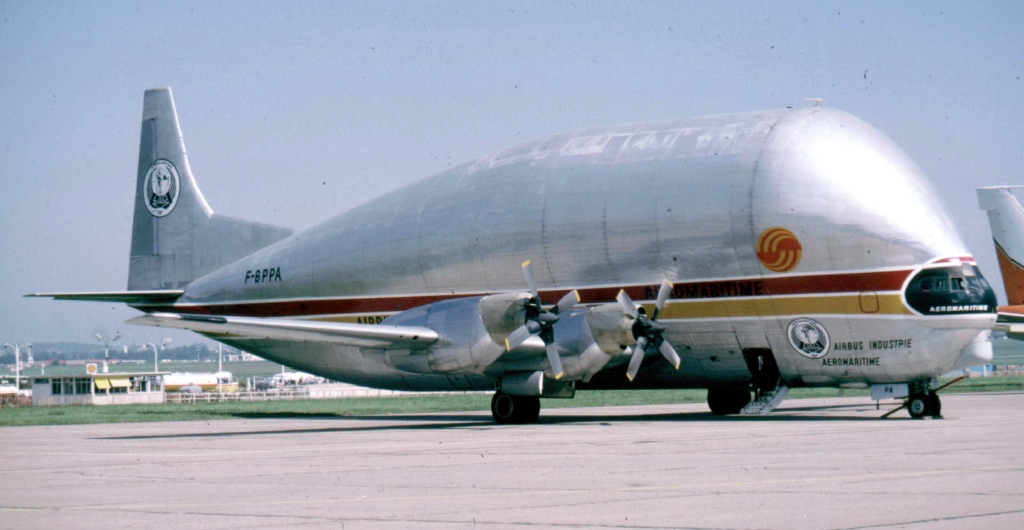
Super Guppy F-BPPA operated for Airbus.

Aero Spacelines, Inc. was an American aircraft manufacturer active from 1960 to 1968, that converted Boeing 377 Stratocruiser and C-97 aircraft into the Guppy line of airplanes, re-engineered to transport oversized cargo such as space exploration vehicles. These inspired later aircraft of similar concept, such as the Conroy Skymonster, Myasishchev VM-T, Airbus Beluga and Boeing Dreamlifter.

== History ==
Aero Spacelines was formed with only one customer in mind: the National Aeronautics and Space Administration. NASA needed to transport outsize cargo from manufacturing plants such as the Michoud Assembly Facility in New Orleans, Louisiana, to Cape Canaveral Air Force Station in Florida. These items were too large to be safely transported by rail or truck. Shipping by sea was time-consuming, expensive, and risky, with the danger of damaging the cargo on turbulent seas. But no aircraft of the day was large enough.

John M. "Jack" Conroy, a retired United States Air Force pilot, and Lee Mansdorf, an aircraft salesman and entrepreneur, formulated the Guppy concept one evening over dinner. They decided to create a company to manufacture outsized aircraft. Conroy hired Robert W. Lillibridge as vice president of manufacturing and engineering, and a team was assembled for the project. Financing was provided by venture capitalist William Ballon, a World War II combat veteran also from the Army Air Corps. In 1960, Aero Spacelines began working at Van Nuys Airport, California, to transform a Boeing 377 airliner into the Pregnant Guppy.

NASA's Project Gemini made early use of the Pregnant Guppy to transport the first and second stages of Titan II GLV from the Martin Co. in Baltimore, Maryland, to Cape Canaveral, Florida. Subsequent versions of the Guppy series hauled the S-IVB, the third stage of the Saturn booster from California to Florida.

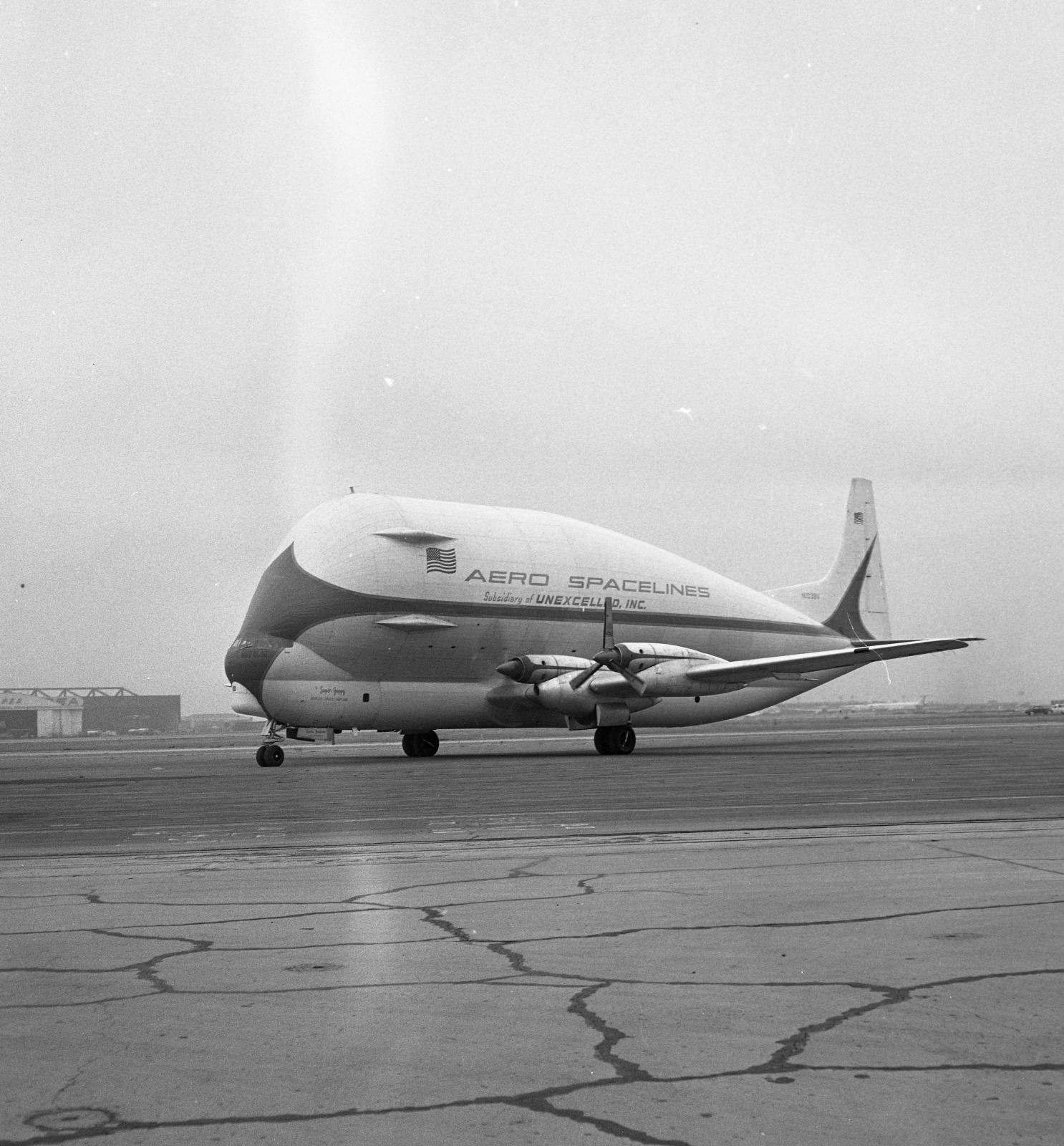
Aero Spacelines Super Guppy at San Diego for DC-10 test; Convair made the DC-10 fuselage. Note "Unexcelled" on the fuselage

Aero Spacelines was sold in August 1965 to Unexcelled, Inc., a publicly traded company that had subsidiaries engaged in discount store retailing, meatpacking equipment and iron castings. Unexcelled also owned American Airmotive Corporation, an aircraft maintenance and repair organization.

In 1966, the company informally suggested to NASA the concept of using the B-52 bomber as a platform for an even larger transporter, keeping the bombers wing, tail and cockpit but rebuilding the fuselage. Proposed applications included transporting the Saturn S-II stage.

Conroy resigned from the company in August 1967, following which former Boeing test pilot Tex Johnston was appointed to lead the company effective January 1968.

In 1968, the Civil Aeronautics Board (CAB) gave Aero Spacelines an exemption permitting them to offer Guppy transport services to the public. The CAB was a now-defunct federal agency that, at the time, tightly regulated almost all US commercial air transport. The CAB's permission was required for Aero Spacelines to offer air transport services to the public.

By November 1968, NASA had paid Aero Spacelines $11,591,633 in contracts.

In 1972, Unexcelled changed its name to Twin Fair, the name of its retailing subsidiary. In 1981, Twin Fair sold Aero Spacelines to Tracor, which dropped the name in favor of Tracor Aviation.

In 1969, Jack Conroy, no longer at Aero, built the Conroy Skymonster, a similar concept to the Guppy series but based on the Canadair CL-44 aircraft instead of the C-97.

As of August 2022, one Super Guppy was still in operation. NASA uses it to transport vehicles, and leases it to third parties when not in use.

In early 2016, NASA used that aircraft to transport the main structure of Orion crew capsule, from its Michoud Manufacturing Facility in New Orleans, Louisiana, to the Kennedy Space Center in Florida, where the capsule underwent its first uncrewed test flight aboard the Space Launch System rocket. In November 2019, NASA used the aircraft to transport the Orion capsule from the Kennedy Space Center to the Mansfield Lahm Airport in Ohio for thermal and vacuum tests.

== List of aircraft ==
Aero Spacelines produced three Guppy aircraft models.

- Pregnant Guppy (1962) - 1 built
- Super Guppy (1965) - 5 built
- Mini Guppy (1967) - 3 built

== See also ==
- Airbus Beluga
- Boeing Dreamlifter
- Conroy Skymonster
- Myasishchev VM-T
