= List of preserved Aero Spacelines aircraft =

This article is a list of aircraft that were manufactured by the Aero Spacelines and are in preservation.

== Preserved ==
=== Mini Guppy ===
| Aircraft | Photograph | Build date | First flight | Last flight | Operator | Location | Status | Notes | Ref. |
|---|---|---|---|---|---|---|---|---|---|
| N422AU | | 1967 | May 24, 1967 | 1995 | Aero Spacelines; American Jet Industries; Aero Union; Erickson Inc. | Tillamook Air Museum in Tillamook, Oregon | On static display | | |

=== Super Guppy ===
| Aircraft | Photograph | Build date | First flight | Last flight | Operator | Location | Status | Notes | Ref. |
|---|---|---|---|---|---|---|---|---|---|
| N940NS/N1038V | | 1965 | August 31, 1965 | 1990 | NASA | Pima Air and Space Museum at Pima County, Arizona | On static display | | |

=== Super Guppy Turbine ===
| Aircraft | Photograph | Build date | First flight | Last flight | Operator | Location | Status | Notes | Ref. |
|---|---|---|---|---|---|---|---|---|---|
| F-BPPA/N212AS | | 1972 | October 24, 1972 | March 15, 1996 | NASA; Airbus Industries | Airbus facility, Toulouse–Blagnac Airport, Blagnac, Haute-Garonne, Occitania, France | On static display | | |
| F-GDSG | | 1982 | July 1, 1982 | October 16, 1997 | Airbus Industries | Airbus facility, Hamburg Finkenwerder Airport, Hamburg, Germany | On static display | | |
| N941NA/F-GEAI | | 1965 | August 31, 1965 | 1990 | NASA | Pima Air and Space Museum at Pima County, Arizona | On static display | | |
