= Aero Spacelines Super Guppy =

Larger turboprop version of outsize cargo aircraft Pregnant Guppy

B-377-SG/SGT Super Guppy
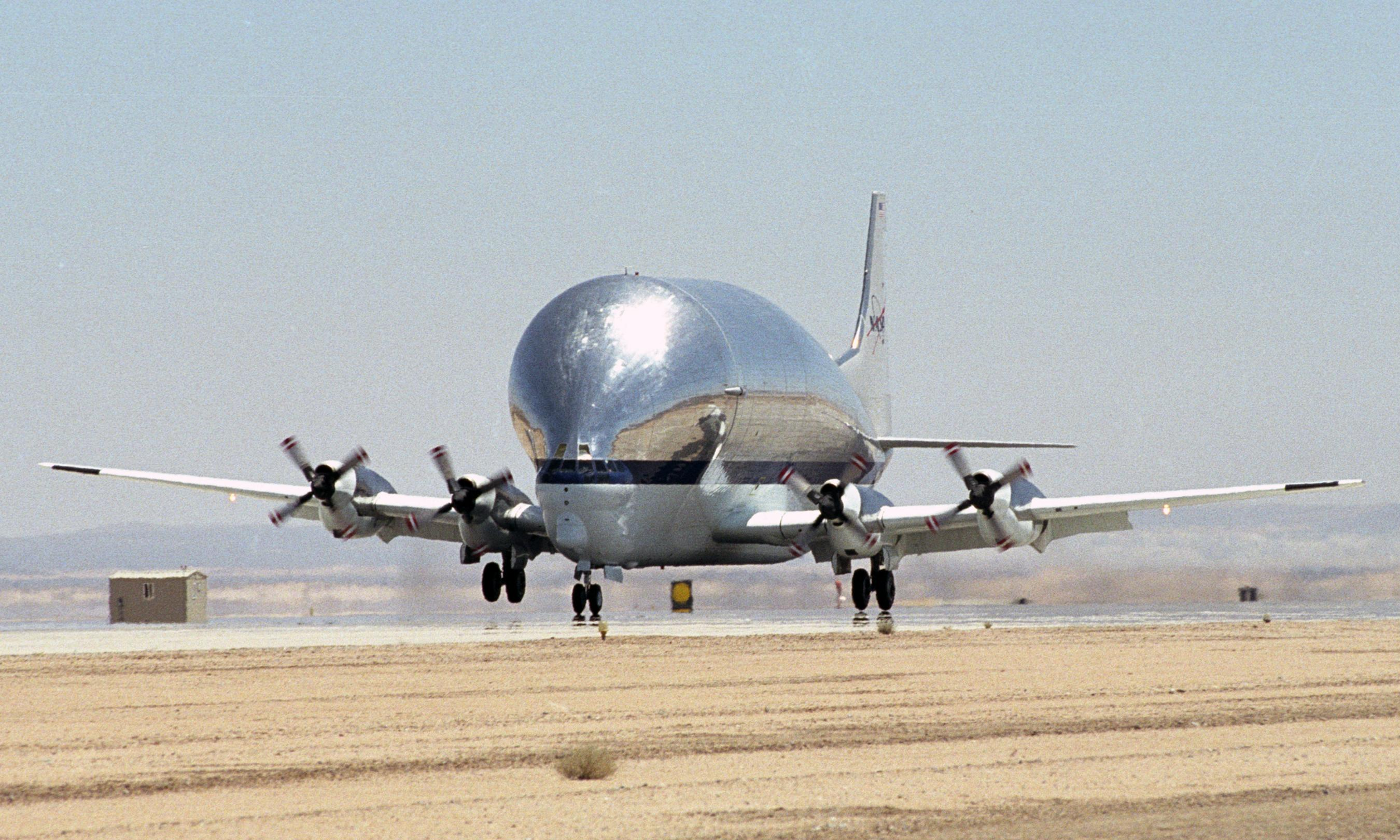
- Super Guppy Turbine used by NASA

General information
- Type: Outsize cargo aircraft
- Manufacturer: Aero Spacelines / Boeing
- Status: One in service, operated by NASA
- Primary users: Aero Spacelines NASA, Airbus, Aeromaritime
- Number built: 1 SG, 4 SGT

History
- First flight: August 31, 1965
- Developed from: Boeing C-97 Stratofreighter; Boeing 377 Stratocruiser

The Aero Spacelines Super Guppy Turbine is a large, wide-bodied, four-engined, turboprop cargo aircraft used for transporting outsize cargo components. It was the successor to the Pregnant Guppy, the first of the Guppy aircraft produced by Aero Spacelines. Five were built in two variants, both of which were colloquially referred to as the "Super Guppy".

The Super Guppy is the only airplane to have carried a complete S-IVB stage, the third stage of the Saturn V rocket, weighing in at 27,000 lb or 13,500 kg. It did so several times during the Apollo program.

== Design and development ==
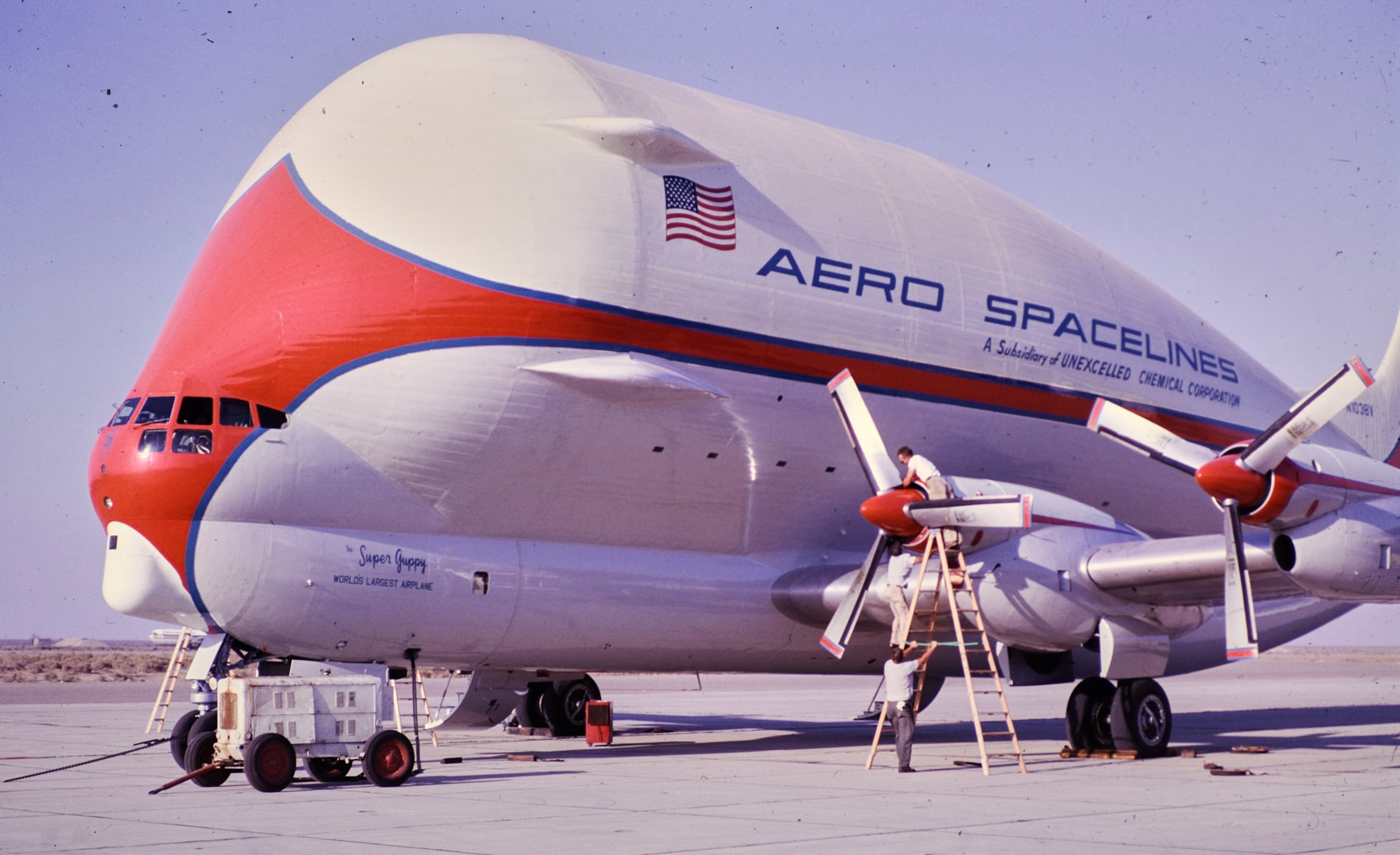
Super Guppy September 1965, Lancaster, CA, USA

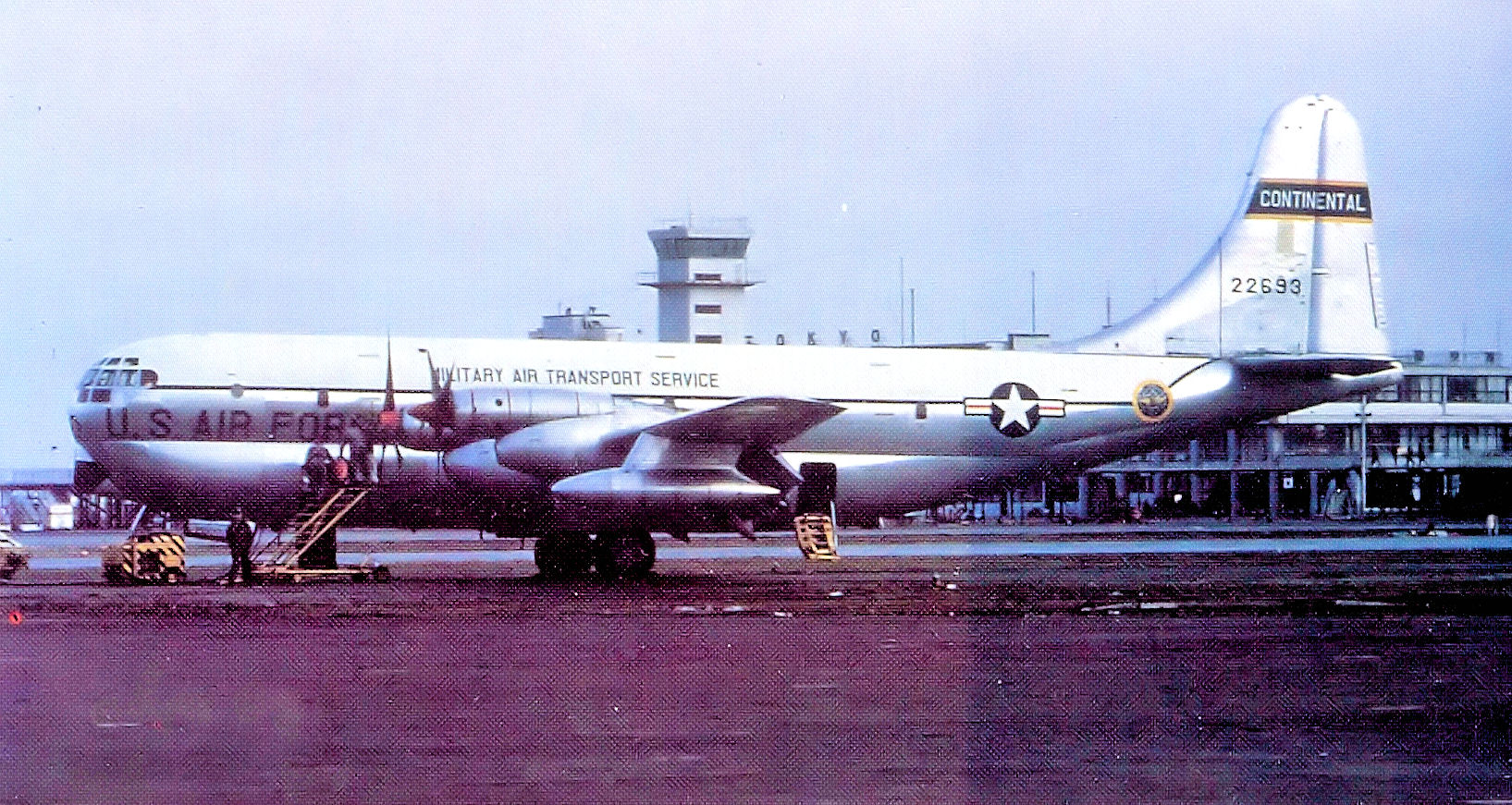
USAF Boeing YC-97J Stratofreighter 52-2693, seen in 1952, before conversion to the first Super Guppy

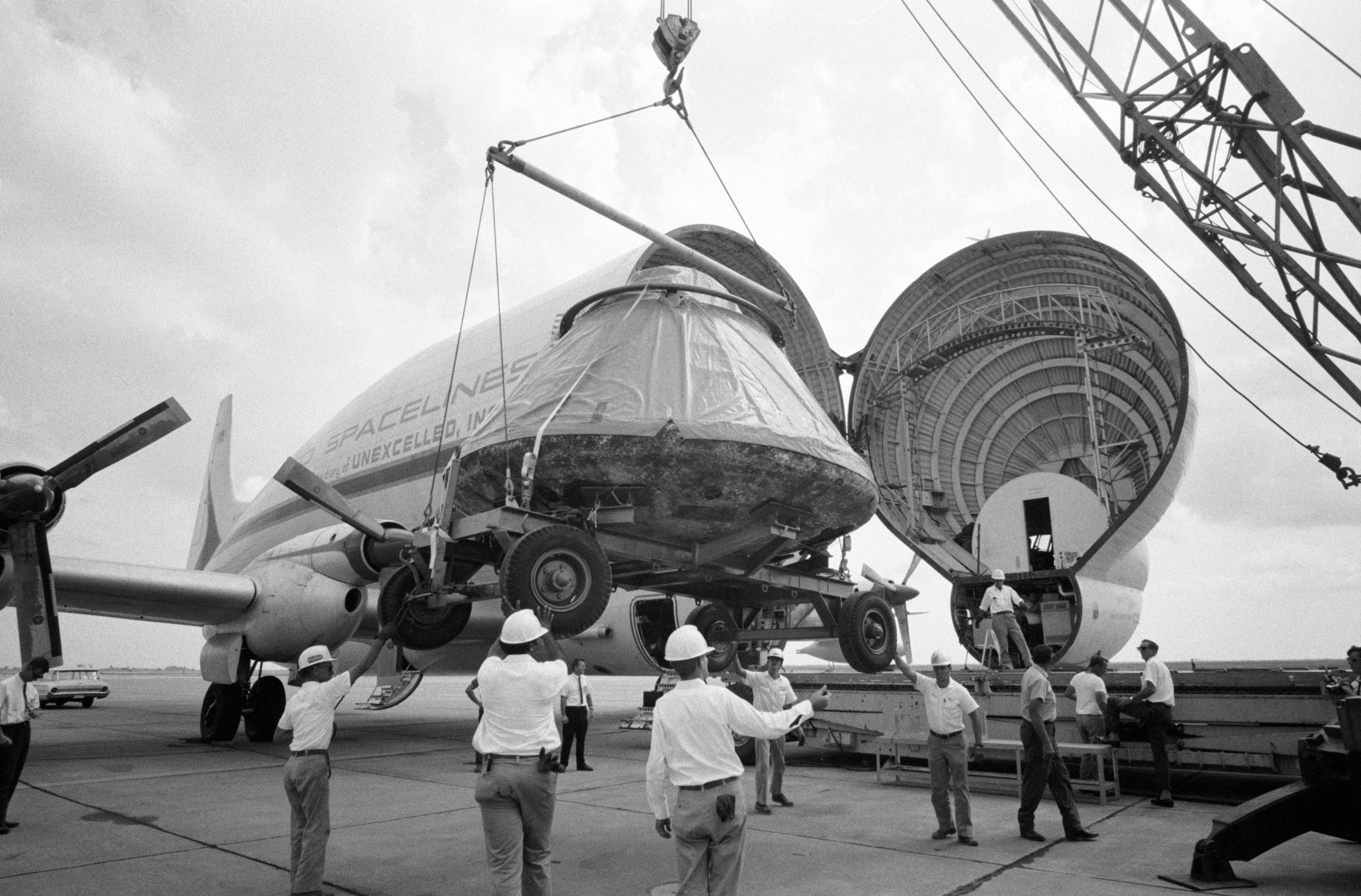
Apollo 11 command module Columbia being loaded aboard a Super Guppy at Ellington AFB, August 1969

The first Super Guppy, or "SG", was built directly from a retired USAF Boeing YC-97J Stratofreighter. The fuselage was lengthened to 141 feet (43 m) and ballooned out to a maximum inside diameter of 25 ft (7.6 m), with the length of the cargo compartment being 94 ft 6 in (28.8 m). The floor of the cargo compartment was still only 8 ft 9 in (2.7 m) wide, as necessitated by the use of the Stratocruiser fuselage.

In addition to the fuselage modifications, the Super Guppy used Pratt & Whitney T-34-P-7WA turboprop engines for increased power and range, and modified wing and tail surfaces. It could carry a load of 54,000 pounds (24,000 kg) and cruise at 300 mph (480 km/h).

After a month of tests, Super Guppy suffered fuselage collapse on September 25, 1965, when undergoing high-speed dives during certification tests. After starting a dive at 10,000 feet, the upper fuselage collapsed. The plane had been carrying 30,000 pounds of borate in 100-pound sacks, which were damaged and spilled powder that temporarily blinded the crew. With the help of a DC-9 chase plane, the crew was able to land on the dry bed of Rogers Dry Lake and save the aircraft. After that, Guppy's upper superstructure was redesigned and rebuilt at Edwards Air Force Base.

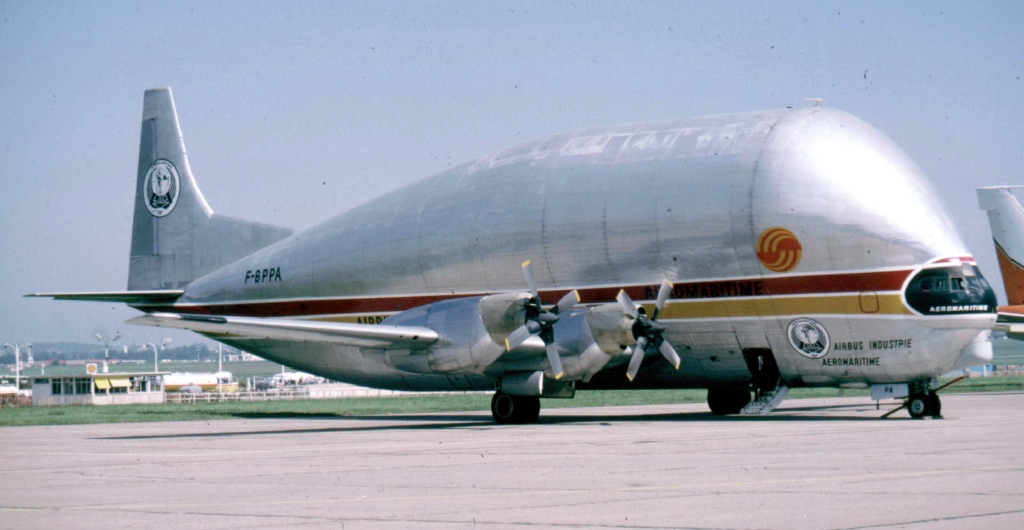
Super Guppy Turbine F-BPPA at Paris–Le Bourget Airport in 1981

The second version was officially known as the Super Guppy Turbine (SGT), although the first Super Guppy also used turboprop engines. However, this variant used Allison 501-D22C engines. Unlike the previous Guppy, the main portion of its fuselage was constructed from scratch. By doing so, Aero Spacelines was able to widen the floor of the cargo compartment to 13 ft (4 m). The overall cargo-compartment length was increased to 111 ft 6 in (34 m), and the improved fuselage and engines allowed for a maximum load of 52,500 lb (23,800 kg). These design improvements, combined with a pressurized crew cabin that allowed for higher-altitude cruising, allowed the SGT to transport more cargo than its predecessors.

The SGT retained only the cockpit, wings, tail, and main landing gear of the 377. The nose gear was taken from a Boeing 707 and rotated 180°. This dropped the front of the aircraft slightly, levelling the cargo-bay floor and simplifying loading operations.

In the early 1970s, two SGT aircraft were used by Airbus to transport airplane parts from production facilities to the final assembly plant in Toulouse. In 1982 and 1983, two additional Super Guppy Turbines were built by Union de Transports Aériens Industries in France after Airbus bought the rights to produce the aircraft. The four Super Guppies were later replaced in this role by the Airbus Beluga, capable of carrying twice as much cargo by weight.

== Variants ==
- Aero Spacelines B-377-SG Super Guppy was a prototype of a much-enlarged version of the Guppy using C-97J components, powered by four Pratt & Whitney T-34-P-7WA turboprop engines.
- Aero Spacelines B-377-SGT Super Guppy Turbine (Guppy 201) was a production version powered by Allison 501-D22C turboprop engines, using an enlarged cargo section built from scratch instead of being converted from original C-97J components.

== Aircraft ==
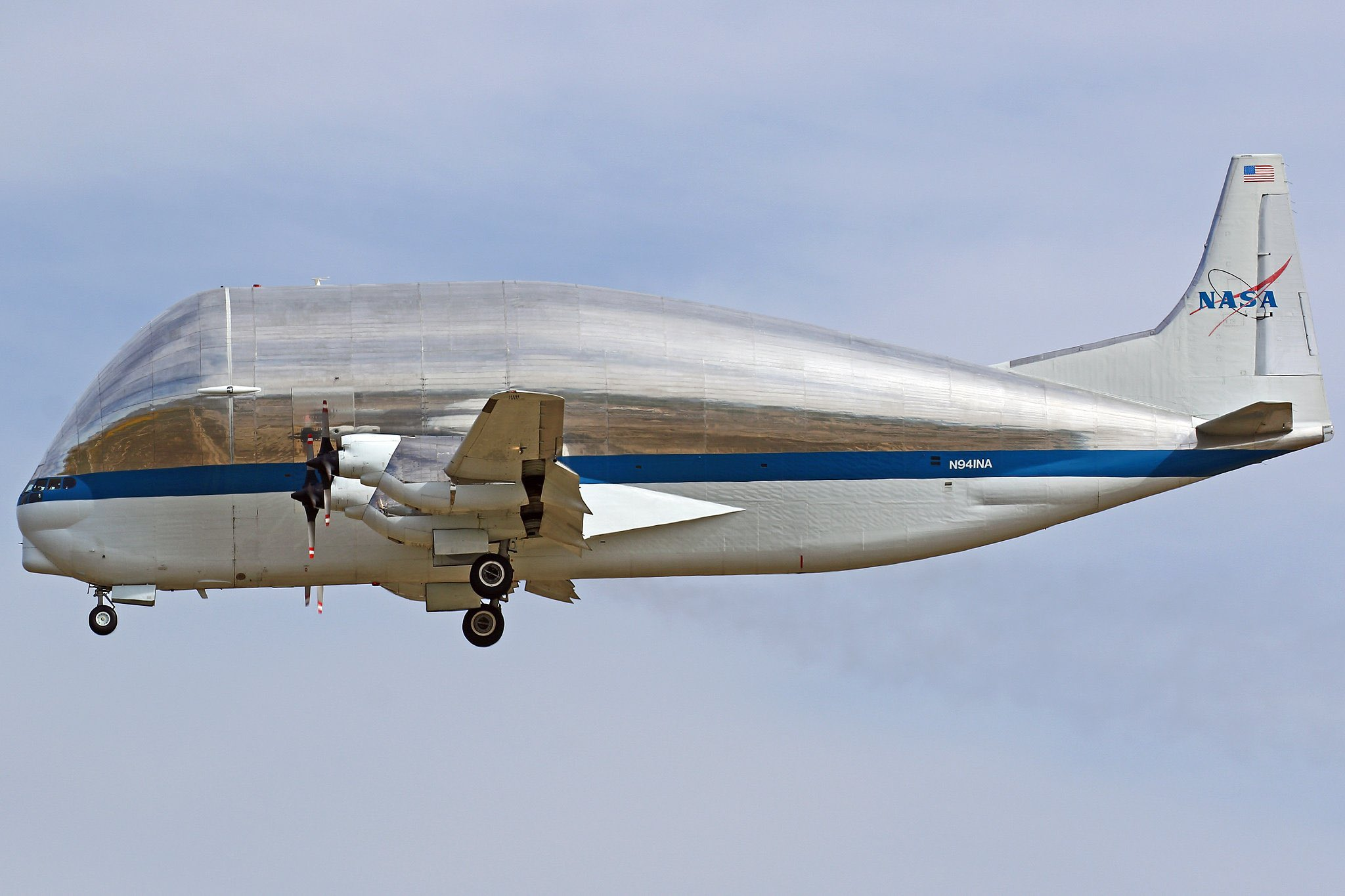
NASA Super Guppy N941NA in-flight, July 2022

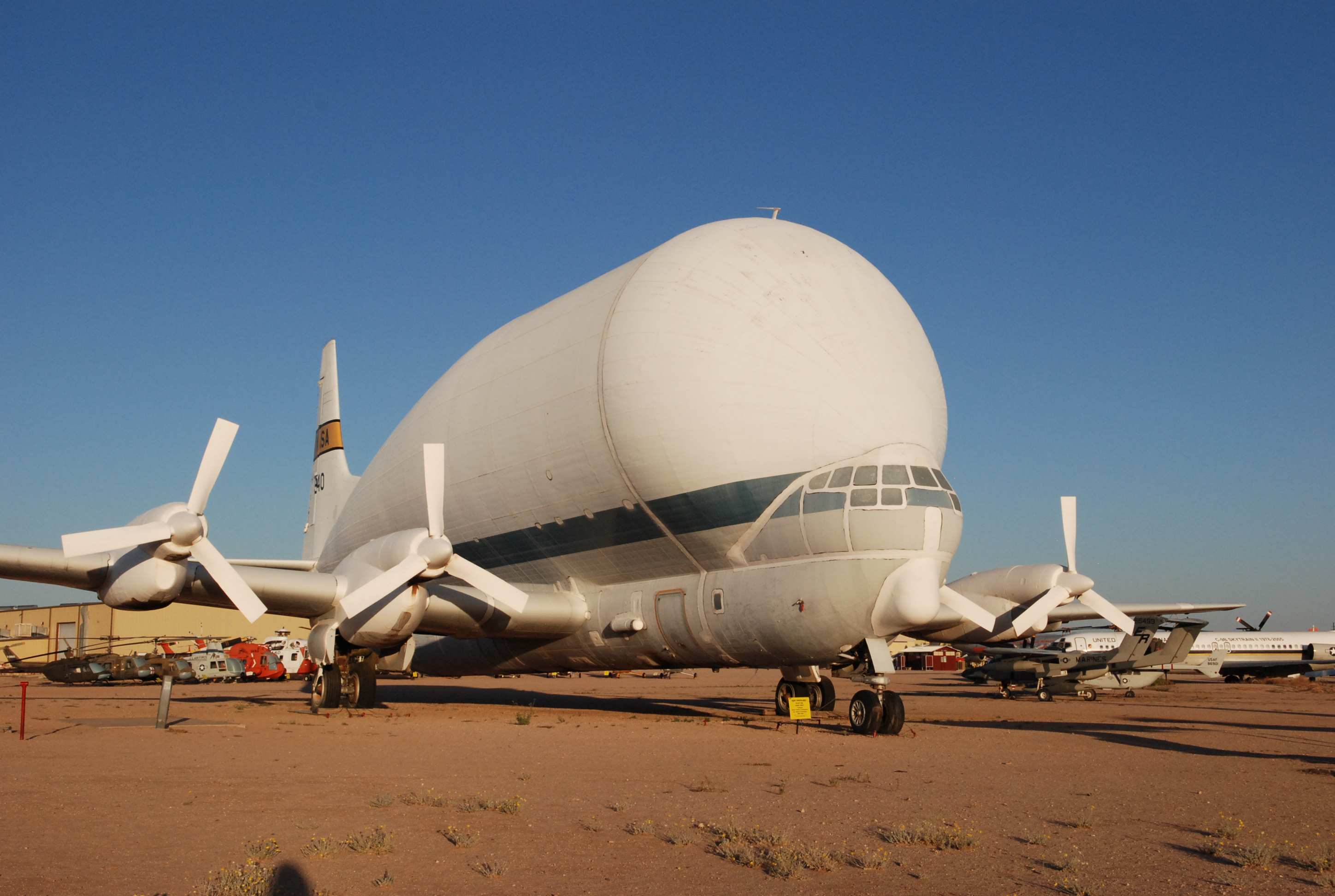
Super Guppy on display at Pima Air & Space Museum

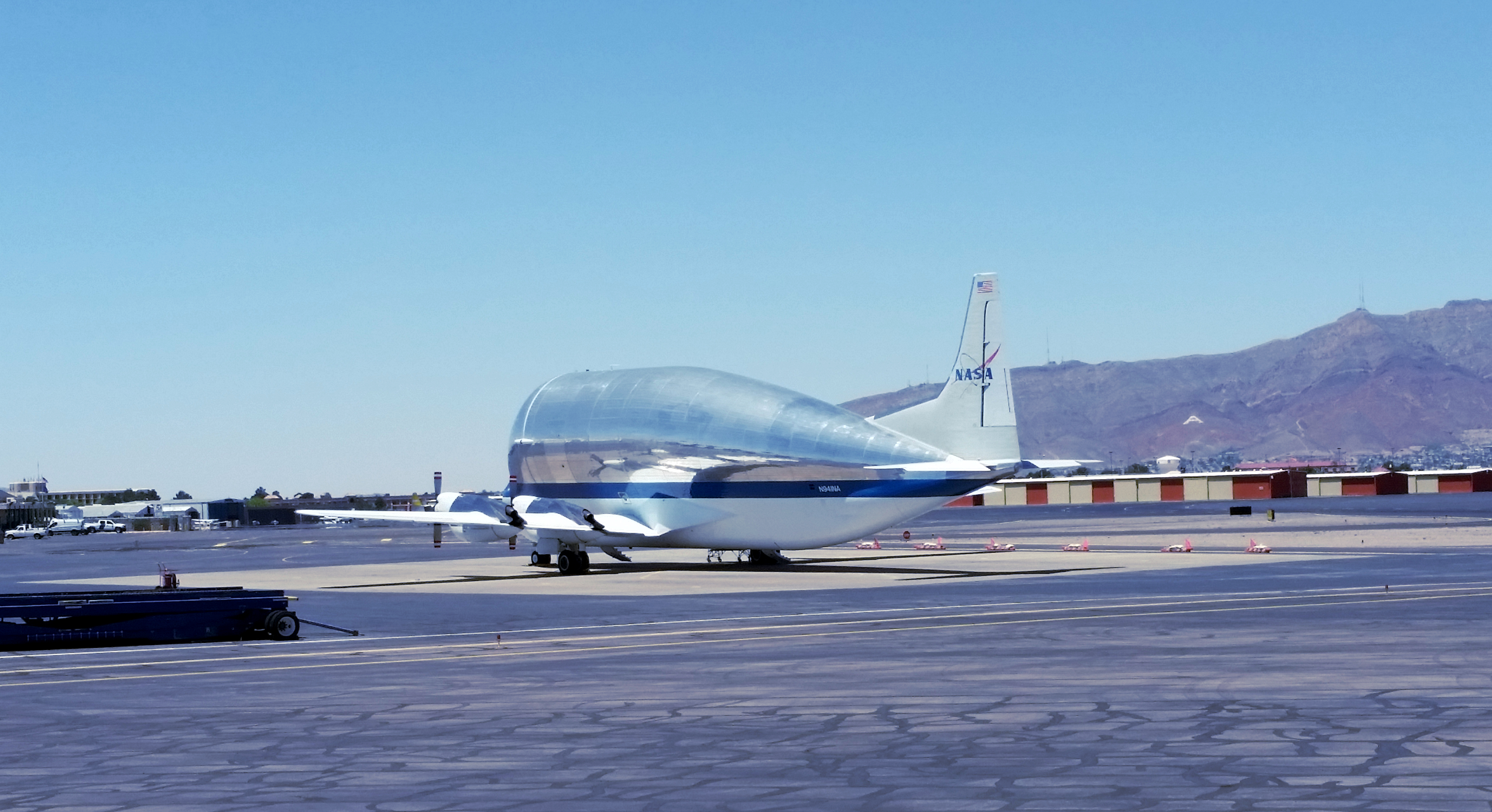
NASA Super Guppy N941NA at its home base in El Paso

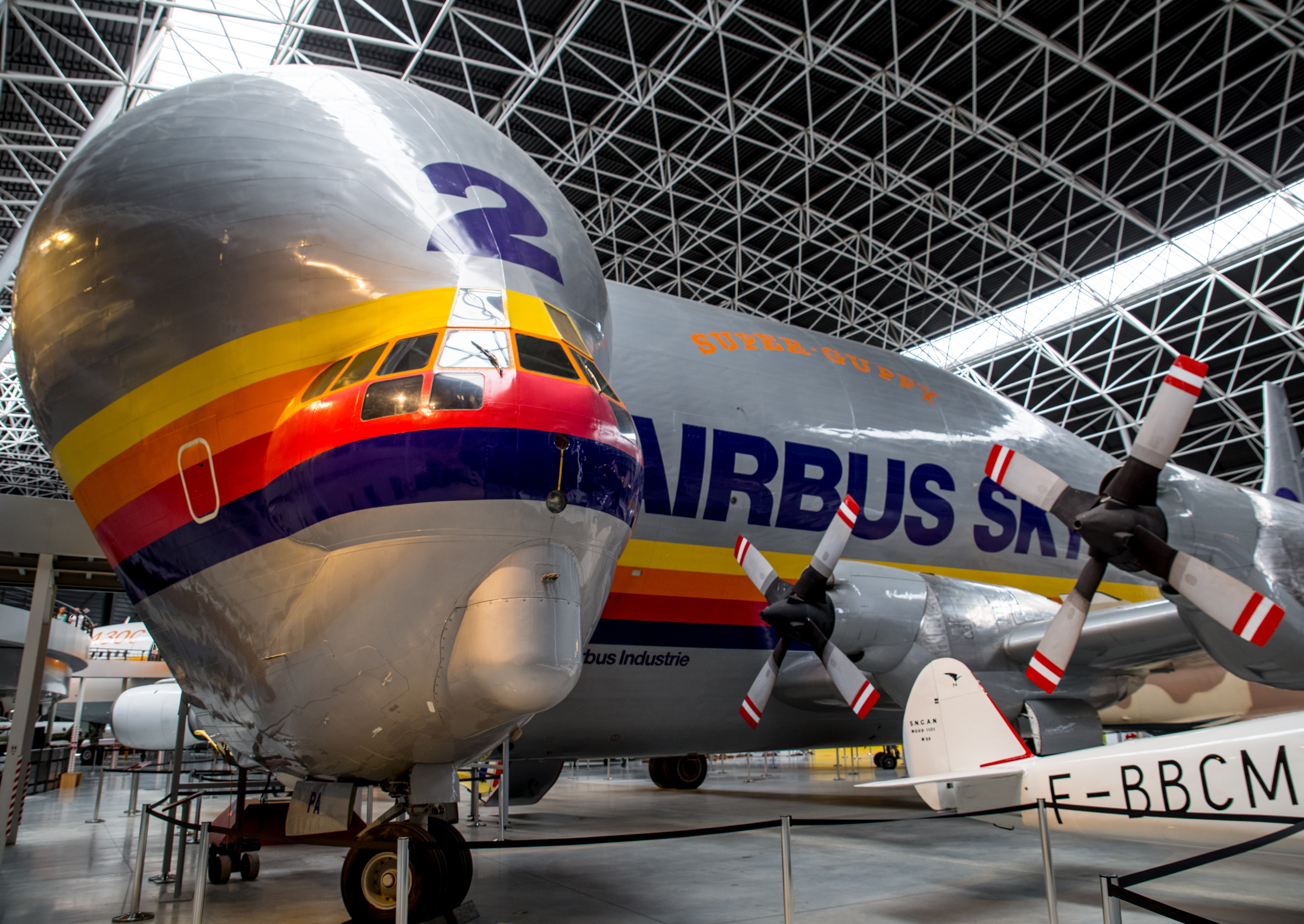
Super Guppy on display at Aeroscopia

One Super Guppy remains in service with NASA. Three are on display, and one was scrapped.

- Super Guppy N940NS (previously N1038V), serial number 52-2693, is on display at the Pima Air & Space Museum near Tucson, Arizona.
- Super Guppy Turbine F-BTGV (formerly N211AS), serial number 0001, was on static display at the former British Aviation Heritage Centre at the Bruntingthorpe Aerodrome. The aircraft was broken up in December 2020 with the cockpit preserved by the South Wales Aviation Museum.
- Super Guppy Turbine F-BPPA (formerly N212AS), serial number 0002, is on static display at Aeroscopia near the Airbus factory at Toulouse–Blagnac Airport in France.
- Super Guppy Turbine F-GDSG, serial number 0003, is on static display near the Airbus factory at Hamburg Finkenwerder Airport in Germany.
- Super Guppy Turbine N941NA (formerly F-GEAI), serial number 0004, is still in service with NASA as a transport aircraft and is based at the El Paso International Airport. The aircraft was damaged in severe weather, with repair work underway.

== Operators ==
=== Current ===
- NASA

=== Former ===
- Aero Spacelines
- Aeromaritime
- Airbus
- Boeing

== Specifications (Super Guppy Turbine) ==
Orthographic diagram of the 377-SGT

Data from Encyclopedia of The World's Commercial and Private Aircraft, NASA.gov

General characteristics

- Crew: 4
- Length: 143 ft 10 in (43.84 m)
- Wingspan: 156 ft 3 in (47.63 m)
- Height: 48 ft 6 in (14.78 m)
- Cargo bay dimensions: 111 ft × 25 ft × 25 ft (33.83 m × 7.62 m × 7.62 m)
- Wing area: 1,965 sq ft (182.6 m^{2})
- Airfoil: root: Boeing 117 (22%); tip: Boeing 117 (9%)
- Empty weight: 101,500 lb (46,040 kg)
- Gross weight: 156,000 lb (70,760 kg) (54,500 lb/24,721 kg payload)
- Max takeoff weight: 170,000 lb (77,111 kg)
- Powerplant: 4 × Allison 501-D22C turboprop engines, 4,680 shp (3,490 kW) each
- Propellers: 4-bladed constant-speed fully-feathering propellers

Performance

- Maximum speed: 250 kn (290 mph, 460 km/h)
- Cruise speed: 220 kn (250 mph, 410 km/h) economical cruise at 20,000 ft (6,096 m)
- Range: 1,734 nmi (1,995 mi, 3,211 km)
- Service ceiling: 25,000 ft (7,600 m) certified
- Wing loading: 86.5 lb/sq ft (422 kg/m^{2})
- Power/mass: 0.11 hp/lb (0.18 kW/kg)

== See also ==
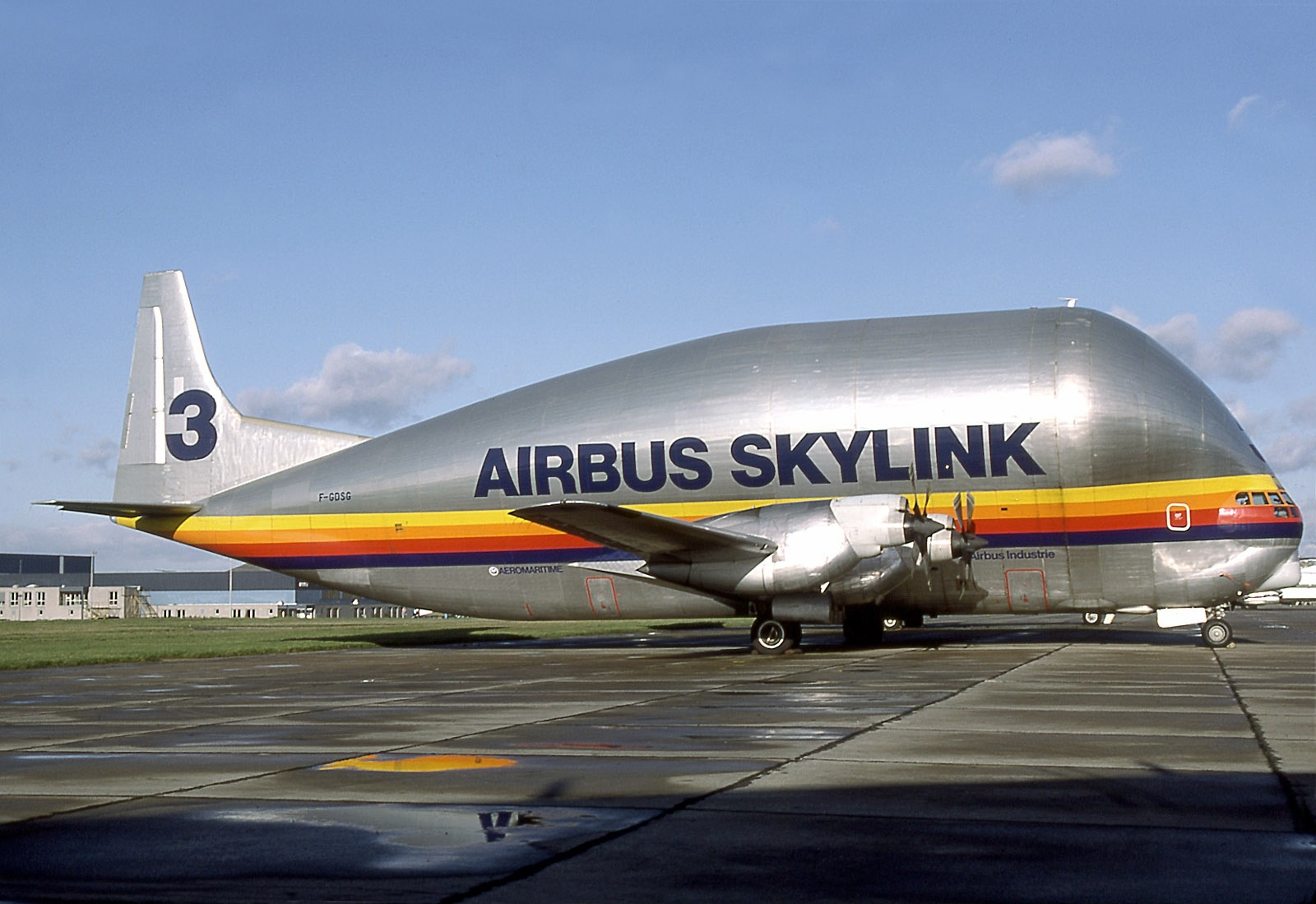
Super Guppy Turbine F-GDSG at Paris–Le Bourget Airport in 1984

Related development

- Boeing B-29 Superfortress
- Boeing 377 Stratocruiser
- Boeing C-97
- Aero Spacelines Pregnant Guppy
- Aero Spacelines Mini Guppy

Aircraft of comparable role, configuration, and era

- Airbus Beluga
- Airbus BelugaXL
- Boeing Dreamlifter
- Conroy Skymonster
- Myasishchev VM-T

== Sources ==
- Taylor, H. A. "Tony" (April–July 1982). "Stratocruiser... Ending an Airline Era". Air Enthusiast. No. 18. pp. 37–53. ISSN 0143-5450.
