= Aero Spacelines Pregnant Guppy =

Outsize cargo conversion of the Boeing 377 Stratocruiser

Pregnant Guppy
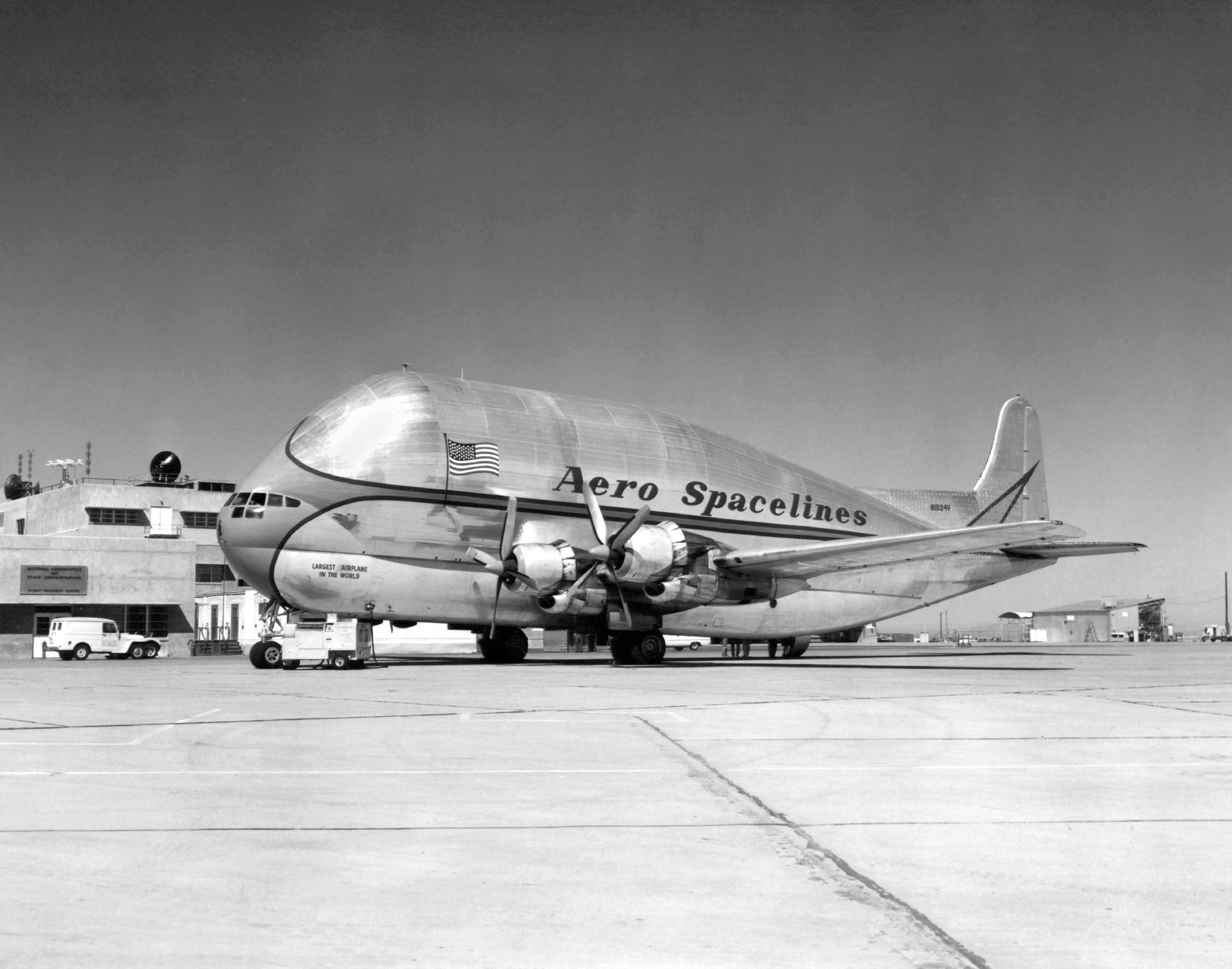
- The Pregnant Guppy at the Dryden Flight Research Center for testing and evaluation (October 1962)

General information
- Type: Outsize cargo freight aircraft
- Manufacturer: Aero Spacelines
- Status: Scrapped at Van Nuys in 1979
- Primary users: Aero Spacelines NASA

History
- Manufactured: 1
- First flight: September 19, 1962
- Retired: 1979
- Developed from: Boeing 377 Stratocruiser
- Developed into: Aero Spacelines Super Guppy

The Aero Spacelines Pregnant Guppy was a large, wide-bodied cargo aircraft built in the United States and used for ferrying outsized cargo items, most notably components of NASA's Apollo program. The Pregnant Guppy was the first of the Guppy line of aircraft produced by Aero Spacelines. The design inspired later designs, such as the jet-powered Airbus Beluga and Boeing Dreamlifter.

== Development ==
In 1960, NASA was using barges to transport increasingly large rocket components from manufacturers on the West Coast to test and launch sites on the East Coast, a method that was slow and expensive. Meanwhile, U.S. airlines were disposing of their obsolete piston-engined Boeing 377 Stratocruisers (introduced in the late 1940s), in favor of the newer jet-engined airliners. Aircraft broker Leo Mansdorf was stockpiling surplus Stratocruisers at Van Nuys for resale.

Ex-USAF pilot John M. Conroy realized that these aircraft could be modified to transport the large but relatively light rocket components (for the Apollo program). Conroy presented his plans for an extensively modified Stratocruiser to NASA, where an official commented that the bloated aircraft resembled a pregnant guppy. Although NASA was lukewarm on the concept, Conroy mortgaged his house and founded Aero Spacelines International to build and operate the concept aircraft.

Conversion work was undertaken by On Mark Engineering. The Pregnant Guppy (registered N1024V) used an ex-Pan Am airframe. A 5-meter section from an ex-British Overseas Airways Corporation aircraft (G-AKGJ) was added immediately behind the wing. A new upper fuselage of 6-meter diameter was added, giving the aircraft a "triple-bubble" appearance when viewed from the front. The entire rear section, including tail surfaces, was detachable to allow cargo to be loaded directly into the fuselage. The wing, engines, tail, nose, and cockpit were unchanged.

The aircraft first flew on September 19, 1962, piloted by Conroy and co-pilot Clay Lacy. When Van Nuys traffic control realized that Conroy intended to take off, they notified police and fire departments to be on alert. However, the huge aircraft performed flawlessly. It differed in handling from a Stratocruiser only in a slight decrease in speed caused by the drag of the larger fuselage.

The Guppy delivered the S-IV Saturn I rocket stage three weeks faster than a barge, for a cost of $16.00 (equivalent to $166.09 today) per mile (1.6 km).

== Operational history ==
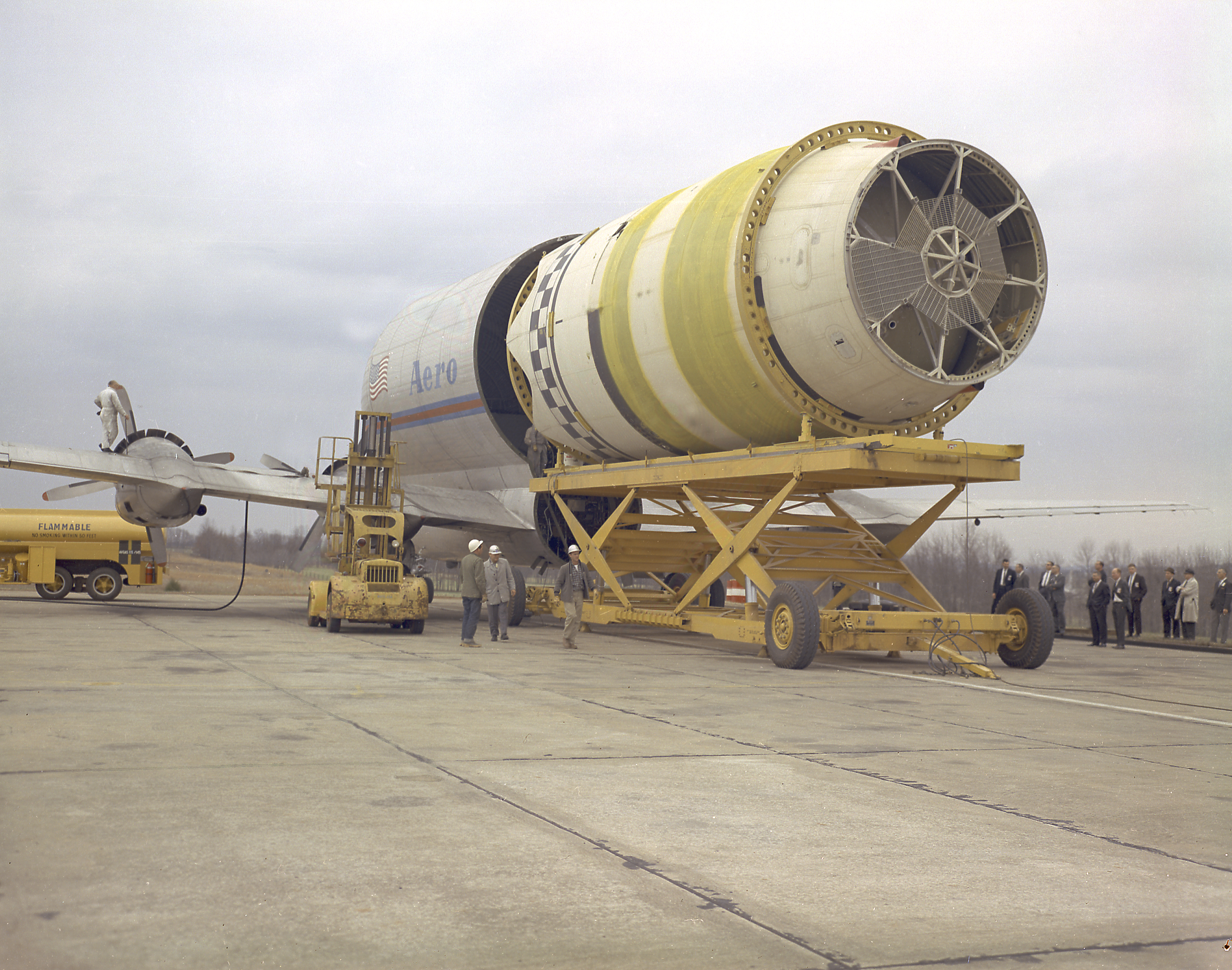
The Pregnant Guppy, with its tail removed, is loaded with a S-IV stage (1965)

In the summer of 1963, the Pregnant Guppy began flying NASA cargo. Among its early duties was transporting the first and second stages of the Gemini program's Titan II from the Martin Co. in Baltimore, Maryland, to Cape Canaveral. As the space program grew through the late 1960s, it became apparent that the one original aircraft clearly could not handle the whole transport load, so 25 more Stratocruisers and ex-USAF C-97s were purchased to construct four Super Guppy aircraft, which were even longer and larger than the original.

The various Guppy aircraft served throughout the 1960s, 1970s, and beyond. After the Apollo program ended, the aircraft transported airliner sections. The original Pregnant Guppy, though, was in poor condition by this point and retired soon after the end of the Apollo program.

The Pregnant Guppy was sold to American Jet Industries in 1974 and registered N126AJ. Although plans were floated to renovate the transport and return it to service, in the end it was scrapped at Van Nuys Airport in 1979. The rear fuselage and tail assembly, along with various other parts, were used to build the final Super Guppy Turbine. Registered N941NA, this aircraft is currently in service with NASA and is the last Guppy aircraft still in operation.

== Specifications (B377PG Pregnant Guppy) ==
Data from Jane's All The Worlds Aircraft 1965–66, Jane's All The Worlds Aircraft 1971–72

General characteristics

- Crew: 3
- Capacity: 34,000 lb (15,422 kg) +
- Length: 127 ft 0 in (38.71 m)
- Wingspan: 141 ft 3 in (43.05 m)
- Diameter: 20 ft 4 in (6.20 m) cabin height
- Height: 31 ft 3 in (9.53 m) to top of fuselage; 38 ft 3 in (12 m) overall
- Wing area: 1,769 sq ft (164.3 m^{2})
- Cargo compartment : volume: 29,187 cu ft (826 m^{3})
- Cargo compartment : total length: 80 ft (24 m)
- Cargo compartment : constant-section length: 30 ft (9 m)
- Cargo compartment : max height: 19 ft 9 in (6 m)
- Cargo compartment : max width: 19 ft 9 in (6 m)
- Cargo compartment : max width: 8 ft 7 in (3 m)
- Airfoil: root: Boeing 117 (22%); tip: Boeing 117 (9%)
- Empty weight: 91,000 lb (41,277 kg)
- Max takeoff weight: 133,000 lb (60,328 kg) (later increased)
- Powerplant: 4 × Pratt & Whitney R-4360-B6 Wasp Major 28-cylinder air-cooled radial piston engines, 3,500 hp (2,600 kW) each
- Powerplant: 4 × Aerojet-General 15KS-1000-A1 solid-fuel assisted take-off rocket engines, 1,000 lbf (4.4 kN) thrust each for 15 seconds
- Propellers: 4-bladed Hamilton-Standard Model 34E60-387 constant-speed fully-feathering propellers

Performance

- Maximum speed: 320 kn (370 mph, 590 km/h)
- Cruise speed: 195 kn (224 mph, 361 km/h) normal operating speed

== See also ==
Related development

- Aero Spacelines Mini Guppy
- Aero Spacelines Super Guppy
- Boeing 377 Stratocruiser
- Boeing B-29 Superfortress

== Works cited ==
- Taylor, H. A. "Tony" (April–July 1982). "Stratocruiser... Ending an Airline Era". Air Enthusiast. No. 18. pp. 37–53. ISSN 0143-5450.
