= Outsize cargo =

Unusually large transported goods

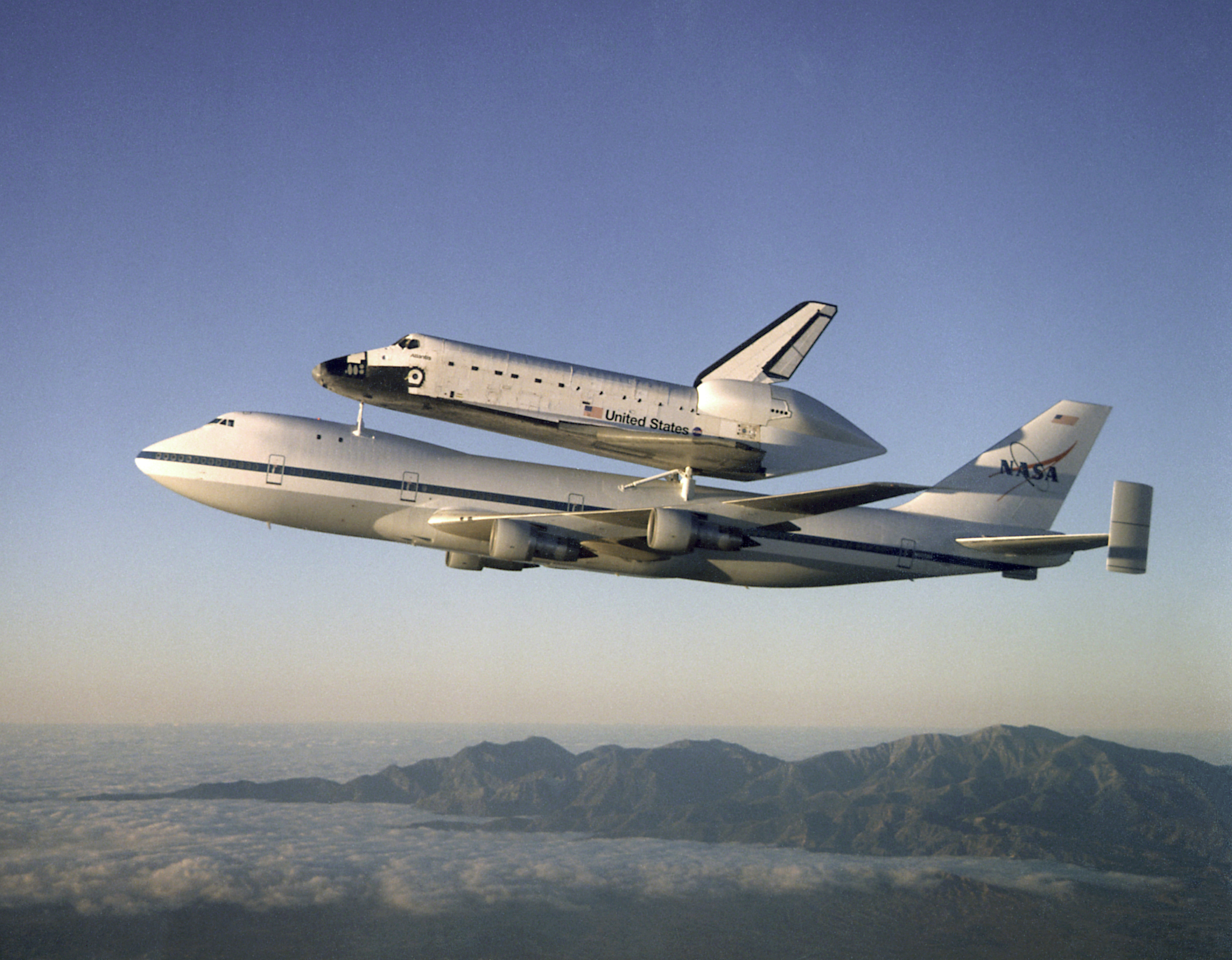
Shuttle Carrier Aircraft carrying Space Shuttle Atlantis

Outsize cargo is a designation given to goods of unusually large size. This term is often applied to cargo which cannot fit on standardized transport devices such as skids (pallets) or containers. This includes military and other vehicles.

In some cases, the cargo may be carried on the exterior atop a large cargo aircraft, such as the Space Shuttle or Buran-class spacecraft.

== List of aircraft that transport outsize cargo ==
- Boeing Dreamlifter
- Airbus Beluga
- Airbus BelugaXL
- Antonov An-225 Mriya
- Aero Spacelines Super Guppy
- Aero Spacelines Pregnant Guppy
- Aero Spacelines Mini Guppy
- Shuttle Carrier Aircraft
- Myasishchev VM-T
- Conroy Skymonster

== See also ==
- Aerial crane, a kind of helicopter used to lift outsize cargo
- Oversize load
