= Airbus Beluga =

Outsize cargo version of the A300-600 airliner

Airbus A300-600ST Beluga
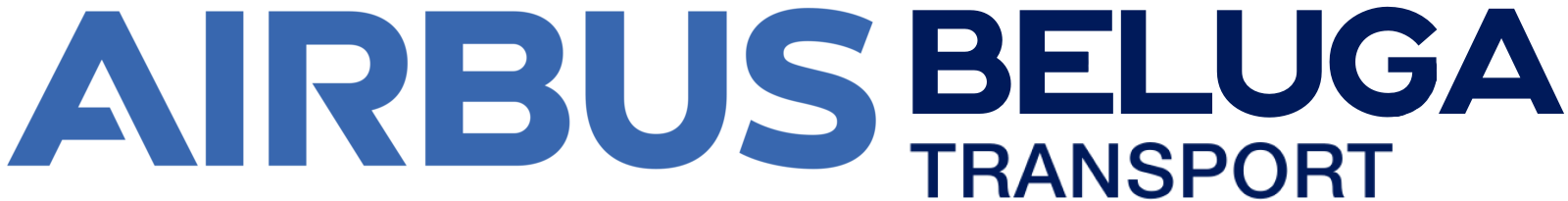

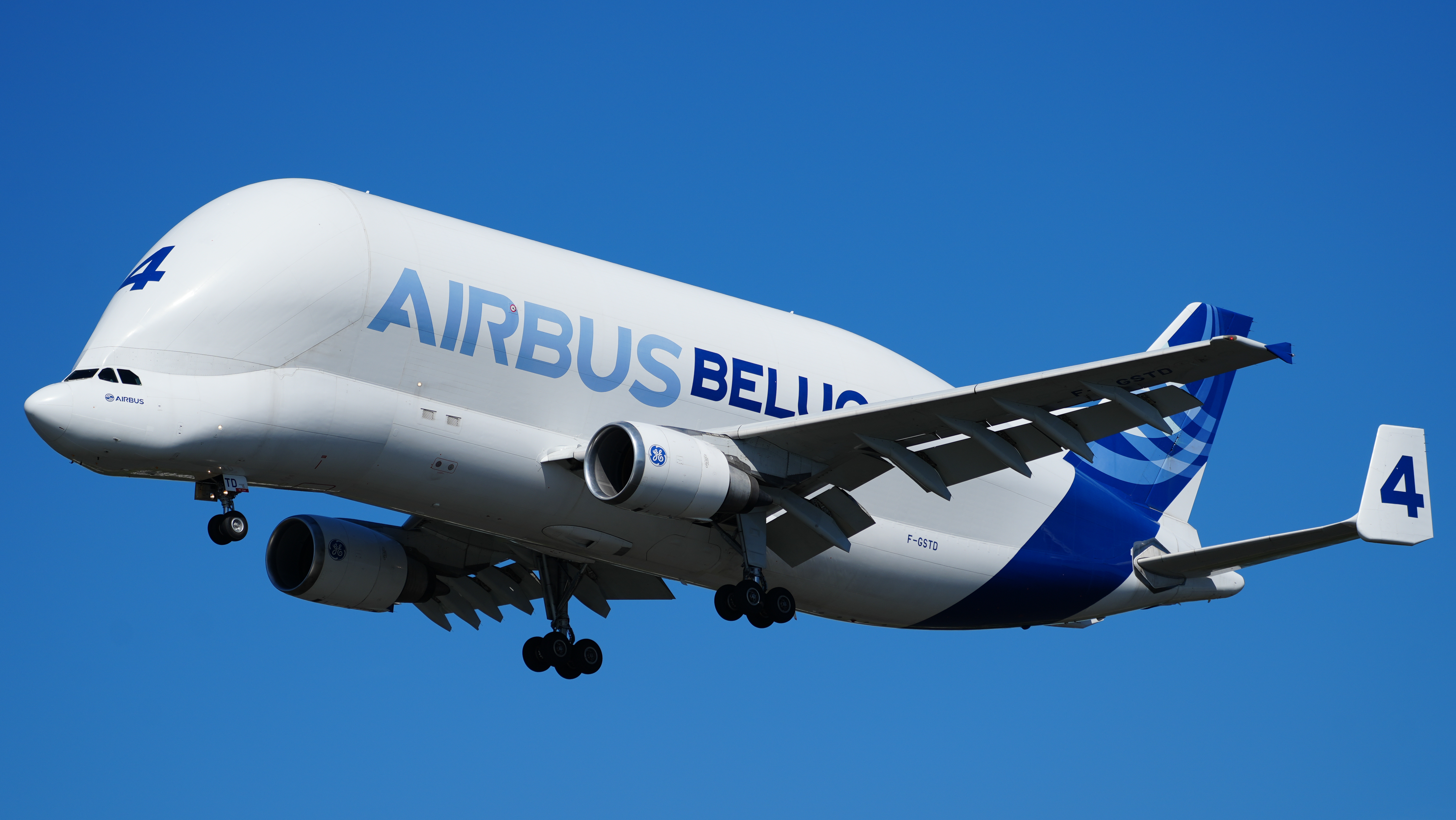
- The Beluga is based on the Airbus A300 with an oversized cargo hold on top

General information
- Type: Oversized freight aircraft
- Manufacturer: Airbus
- Status: In service
- Primary user: Airbus Transport International
- Number built: 5

History
- Manufactured: 1992–c. 1999
- First flight: 13 September 1994; 32 years ago
- In service: September 1995
- Developed from: Airbus A300-600
- Developed into: Airbus BelugaXL

The Airbus A300-600ST (Super Transporter) or Beluga is a specialised wide-body airliner used to transport aircraft parts and outsize cargoes. It received the official name of Super Transporter early on, but its nickname, after the beluga whale, which it resembles, gained popularity and has since been officially adopted.

Due to Airbus's manufacturing facilities being dispersed, the company had a long term need to transport sizeable components, such as wings and fuselage sections, to their final assembly lines. This had been met by a small fleet of Aero Spacelines "Super Guppies", but these aircraft were aged and increasingly maintenance-intensive to keep in operation. While several different existing aircraft were studied, none were found to be fully satisfactory. Instead, the company came to favour developing a derivative of its standard A300-600. In August 1991, a new joint venture company, Super Airbus Transport International (SATIC), was formed to pursue the venture.

Construction of the first aircraft began during September 1992; it performed its maiden flight on 13 September 1994. Entering service in September 1995, the Super Transporter was a larger, faster, and more efficient aircraft than the preceding Super Guppies. A total of five aircraft were built for Airbus; while additional new-build aircraft were offered to prospective operators by SATIC during the 1990s, no other customers ordered the type. In addition to its primary task of conveying Airbus components, the Super Transporter fleet has occasionally been used for charter flights, carrying outsized cargoes for various customers and purposes, from whole helicopters to industrial equipment and humanitarian aid. On 25 January 2022, Airbus announced a service offering outsize cargo transportation using its Beluga fleet.

During the 2010s, Airbus developed a slightly larger successor, the BelugaXL, based on the Airbus A330-200. This fleet, which entered service in January 2020, is intended to eventually replace the original Beluga fleet, which was entering its third decade. The first aircraft was retired in January 2026; the others are expected to be withdrawn from service by 2027.

== Development ==
=== Background ===
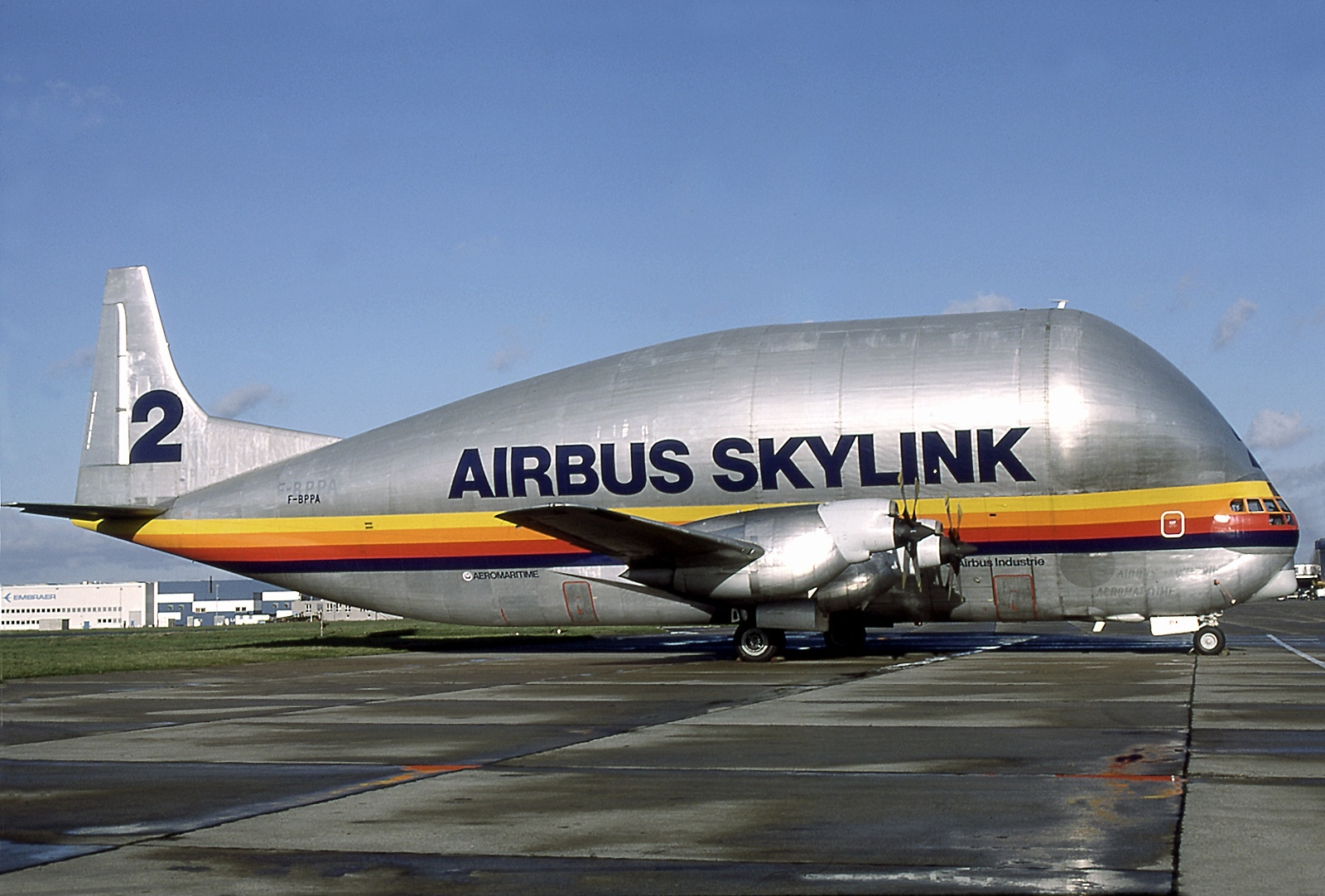
Airbus Skylink Super Guppy in 1984

When Airbus commenced operations in 1970, ground vehicles were initially used to move components and sections; however, growth in production volume soon necessitated a switch to air transport. From 1972 onwards, a fleet of four highly modified Aero Spacelines "Super Guppies" took over. These were 1940s-era Boeing Stratocruisers that had been converted with turbine engines and custom fuselages to carry large-volume loads for NASA's space program in the 1960s. Airbus' use of the Super Guppies led to the jest that "every Airbus is delivered on the wings of a Boeing". Over time, the Super Guppies grew increasingly unsatisfactory for Airbus's ferrying needs: their age meant that operating expenses were high and ever-increasing, and growing Airbus production required greater capacity than could be provided by the existing fleet.

Various options were studied to serve as a replacement transport medium for the Super Guppies, including methods of surface transportation by road, rail, and sea; these alternatives were discarded in favour of a principally air-based solution as they were considered time-consuming and unreliable; in addition, the assembly line in Toulouse was not conveniently accessible by any of the surface methods. A key requirement of the new air transporter was the need to accommodate every major component being manufactured by Airbus, including the then-heaviest planned part, the wing of the larger Airbus A340 variants. A speedy development program was also required to have the prospective type take over duties from the Super Guppy fleet, scheduled to be withdrawn in the mid-1990s.

Several different types of aircraft were examined for potential use, including the Antonov An-124, Antonov An-225, Ilyushin Il-86, Boeing 747, Boeing 767, Lockheed C-5 Galaxy, and McDonnell Douglas C-17 Globemaster III; the use of any existing aircraft was eventually ruled out due to a lack of internal space for the desired components; the use of a piggyback solution was also dismissed as impractical. Boeing made an offer to convert several Boeing 767s for the requirement, but this was viewed as less advantageous than purpose-built aircraft using Airbus' existing twin-engined Airbus A300-600R.

In August 1991, Aérospatiale and DASA, two of the major Airbus partners, formed a 50/50 joint venture company, Super Airbus Transport International (SATIC), based in Toulouse, to develop a new-build replacement for the Super Guppy fleet. The selected starting point for the design was the Airbus A300, leading to the new airframe being designated as the A300-600ST Super Transporter. Following a pre-design period by SATIC, detailed design work was performed by Aérospatiale and DASA while subcontractors were selected to complete the 15 separate work packages; amongst these subcontractors, CASA was selected to produce the upper fuselage, Dornier provided the hydraulic systems, and Sogerma performed the final assembly work. The A300-600ST was not a like-for-like replacement, being larger, faster, and more efficient than the preceding Super Guppies. Airbus elected to invest $1 billion into the program, this sum included the aircraft themselves, the cargo loading system, and program management.

=== Construction and further development ===
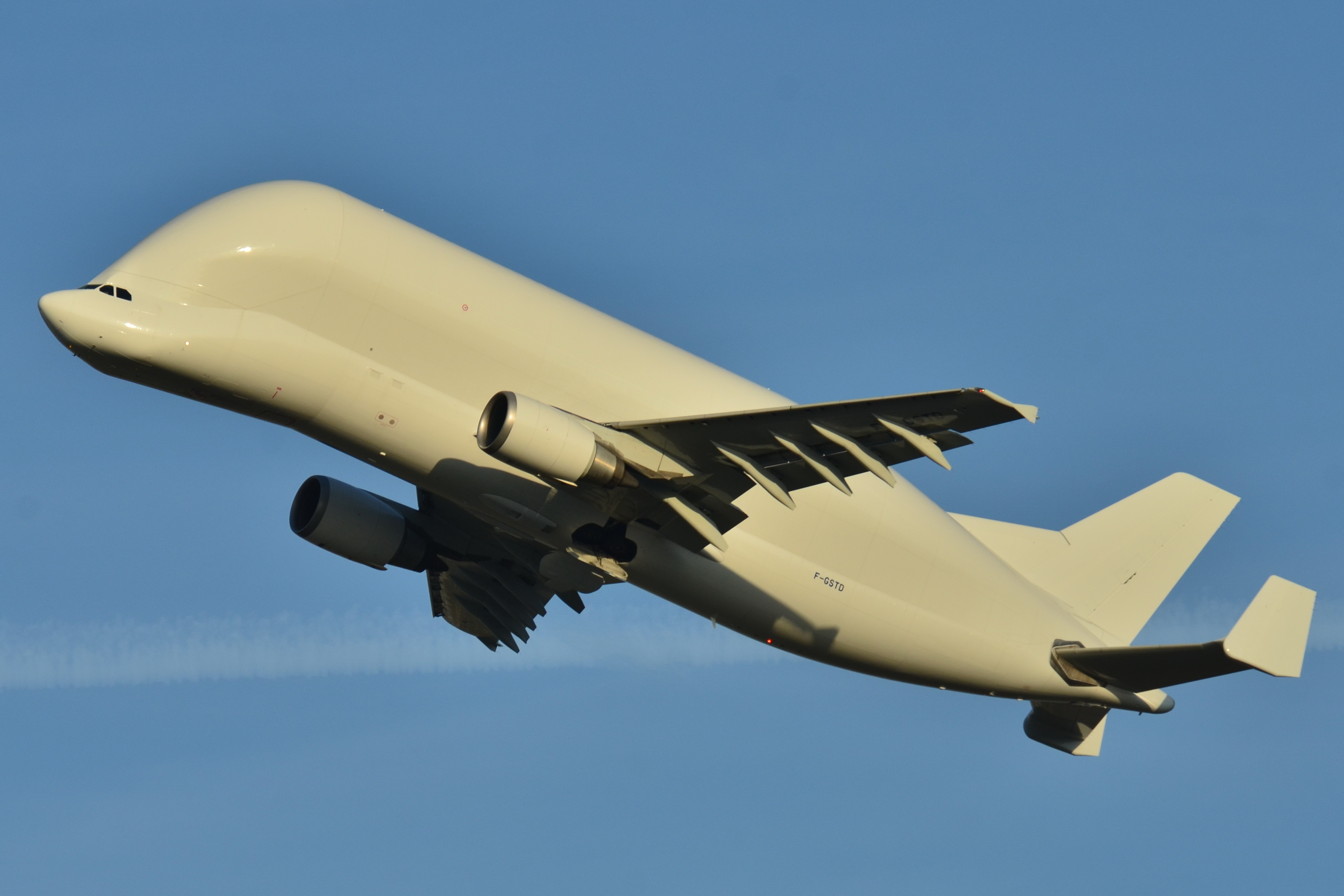
Side view of Beluga F-GSTD, climbing with gear retracting, 2012

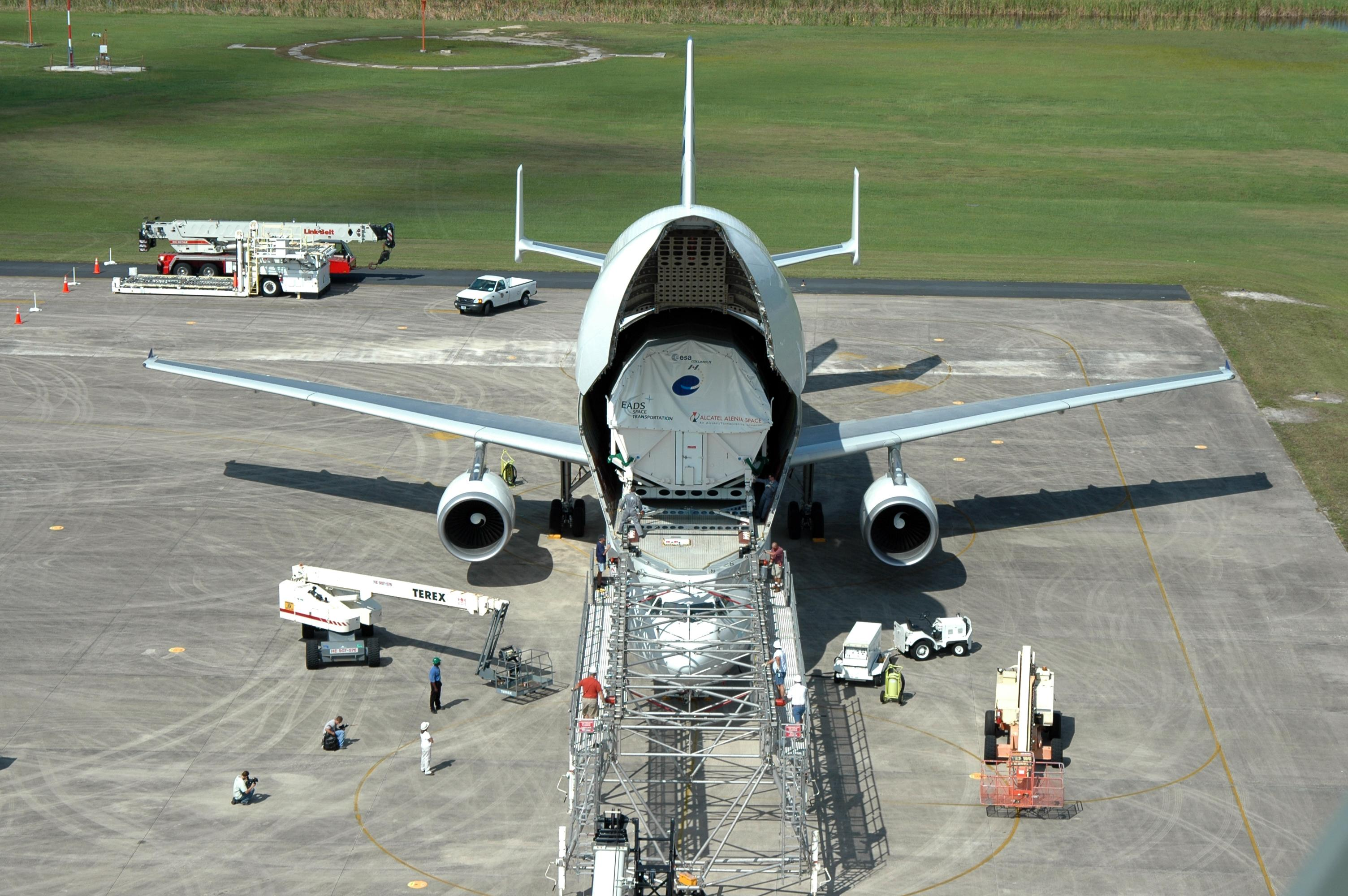

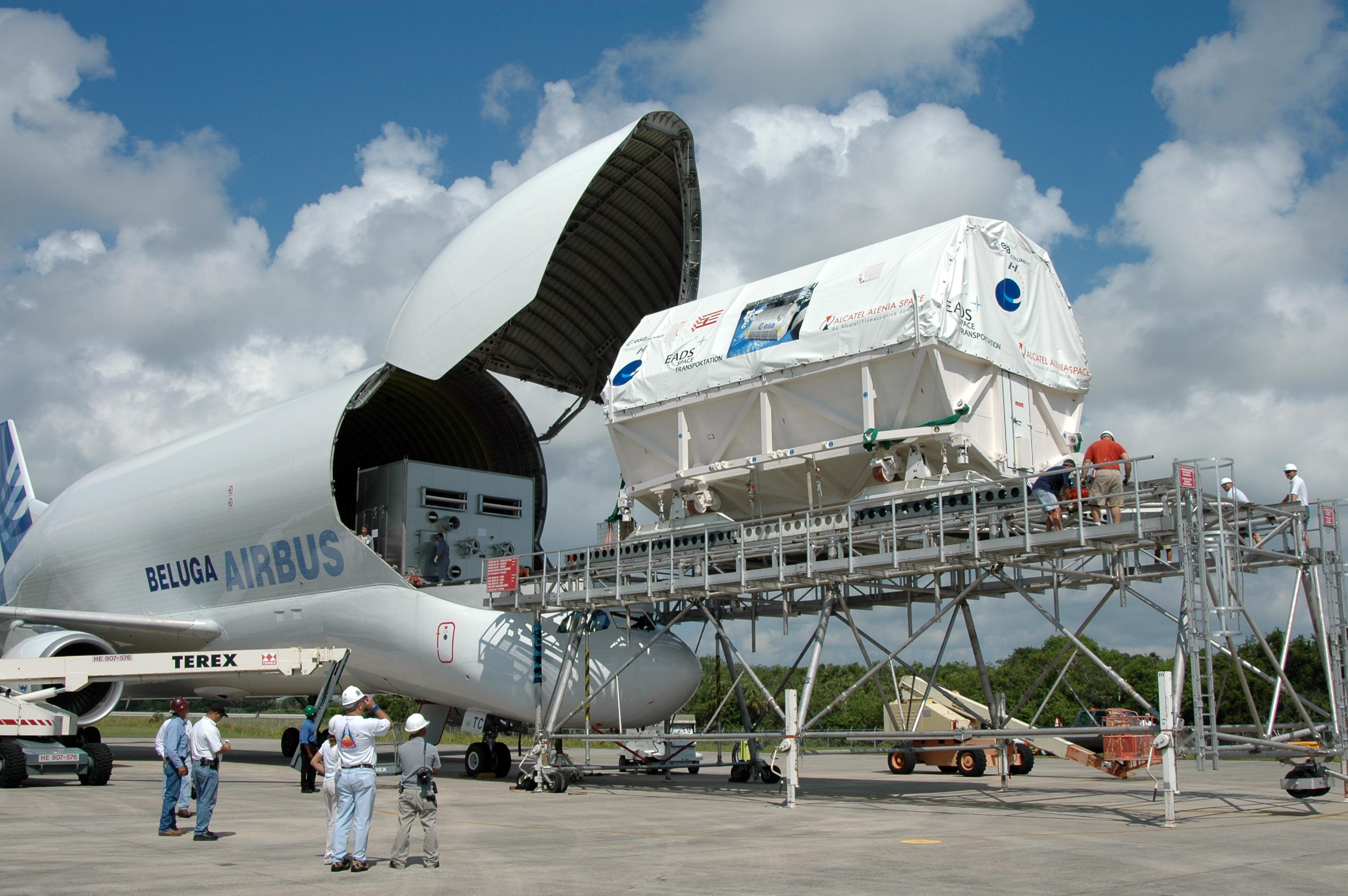
Unloading the International Space Station Columbus module from Beluga F-GSTC at Kennedy Space Centre, 2006

In September 1992, construction work began on the first aircraft, the maiden flight of which took place in September 1994. Following a total of 335 flight hours being performed during the test program, restricted certification of the type was awarded by the European Aviation Safety Agency (EASA) in October 1995, enabling the A300-600ST "Beluga" to enter service shortly thereafter. Originally a total of four aircraft were to be built along with an option for a fifth aircraft being available, which was later firmed up. Apart from the first Beluga, each airframe took an average of three years to complete from start to finish; they were built at a rate of one per year. Modification work was performed at Toulouse using components provided by the Airbus assembly line.

The fleet's primary task is to carry Airbus components ready for final assembly across Europe between Toulouse, Hamburg, and nine other sites, and they do so 60 times per week. The Beluga fleet is owned by Airbus Transport International (ATI), a wholly owned subsidiary of Airbus Group that was established specifically to operate the type; through this organisation, the fleet is made available for hire by third parties for charter flight. In May 1998, ATI reportedly had an annual revenue target of $15 million to be achieved via leasing spare capacity. Over time, the Beluga has been used to carry a variety of special loads, including space station components, large and delicate artwork, industrial machinery, and intact helicopters. The A300-600ST's freight compartment is 7.4 m (24 ft) in diameter and 37.7 m (124 ft) long; maximum payload is 47 tonnes.

In late 1997, in response to the positive performance of the A300-600ST Super Transporter program, SATIC announced that it was in the process of evaluating several different prospective outsize freighter conversions; company chairman Udo Dräger indicated that a larger freighter based on the Airbus A340 could be developed in a similar manner to that of the A300-based Beluga. At the time, derivatives of both the Airbus A330 and the A340 were studied, including combining the upward-swinging hinged door of the Beluga with a conventional upper deck as an alternative to a side-mounted cargo door in traditional freighter missions. During the 1990s, as a result of reported inquiries to Airbus regarding the type, a niche market for selling Beluga-type aircraft to military customers and freight operators was also examined; but sales were considered 'unlikely' to take place by the late 1990s. Its unit cost is €183 million.

In November 2014, Airbus announced that it was proceeding with the development of a larger replacement based on the Airbus A330-200, planning to replace the BelugaST fleet entirely by 2025. The BelugaXL entered service in 2020. Airbus previously considered the A330-300 and A340-500, but each required too much of the limited 1,663 m (5,456 ft) runway at Hawarden Airport near Broughton in Wales. In May 2015, Airbus confirmed that the new aircraft would have a 1 m (3 ft 3 in) wider cross-section than its predecessor and provide a 12% increase in payload. The BelugaXL is intended primarily for A350 work, designed to ship two A350 wings simultaneously. The first two aircraft were considered essential to facilitate mass production of the A350, while the following aircraft were to be progressively introduced as the A300-600 Beluga fleet was withdrawn.

== Design ==
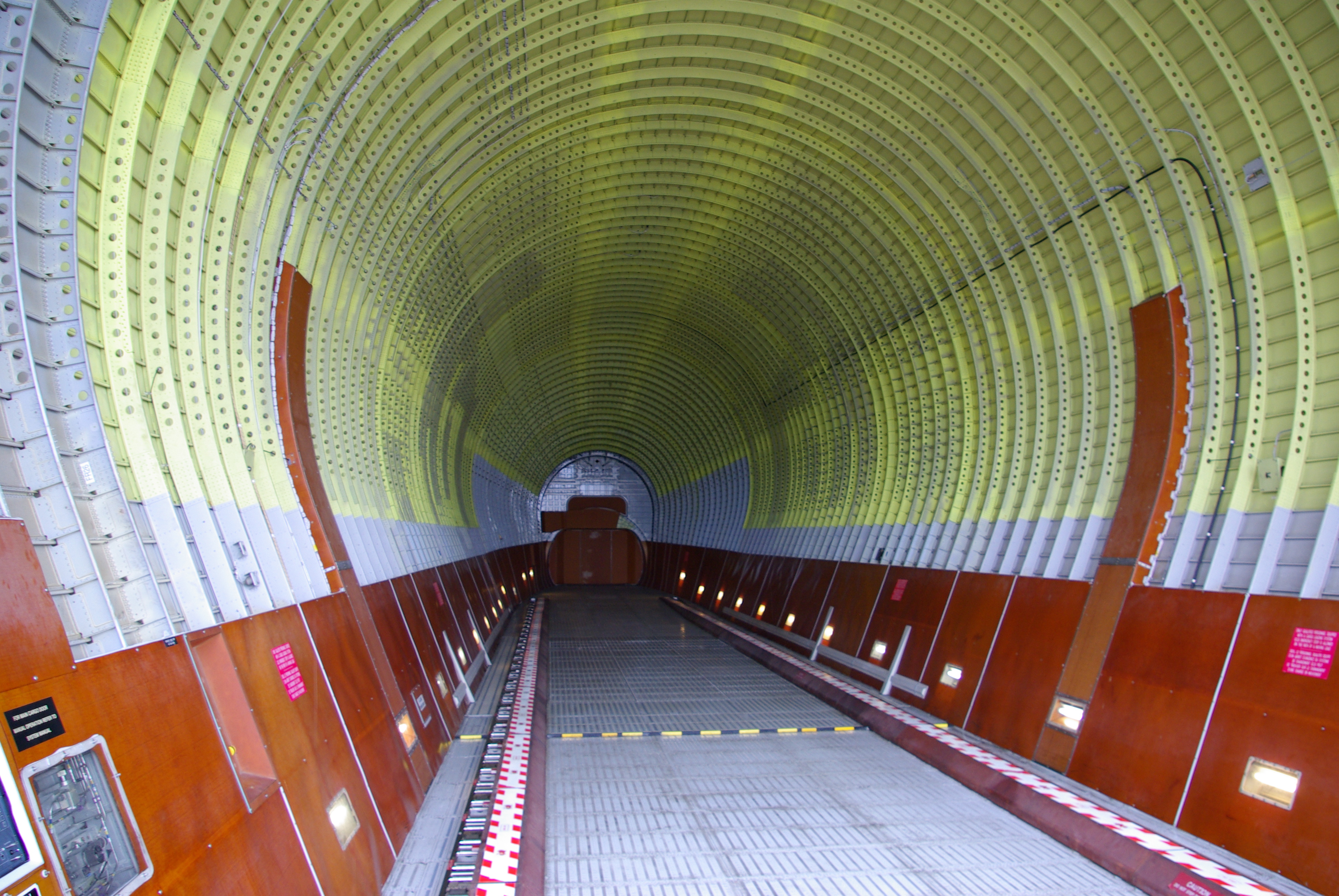
The cargo space of Beluga, F-GSTC; AirExpo 2008, Toulouse Francazal Airport, France

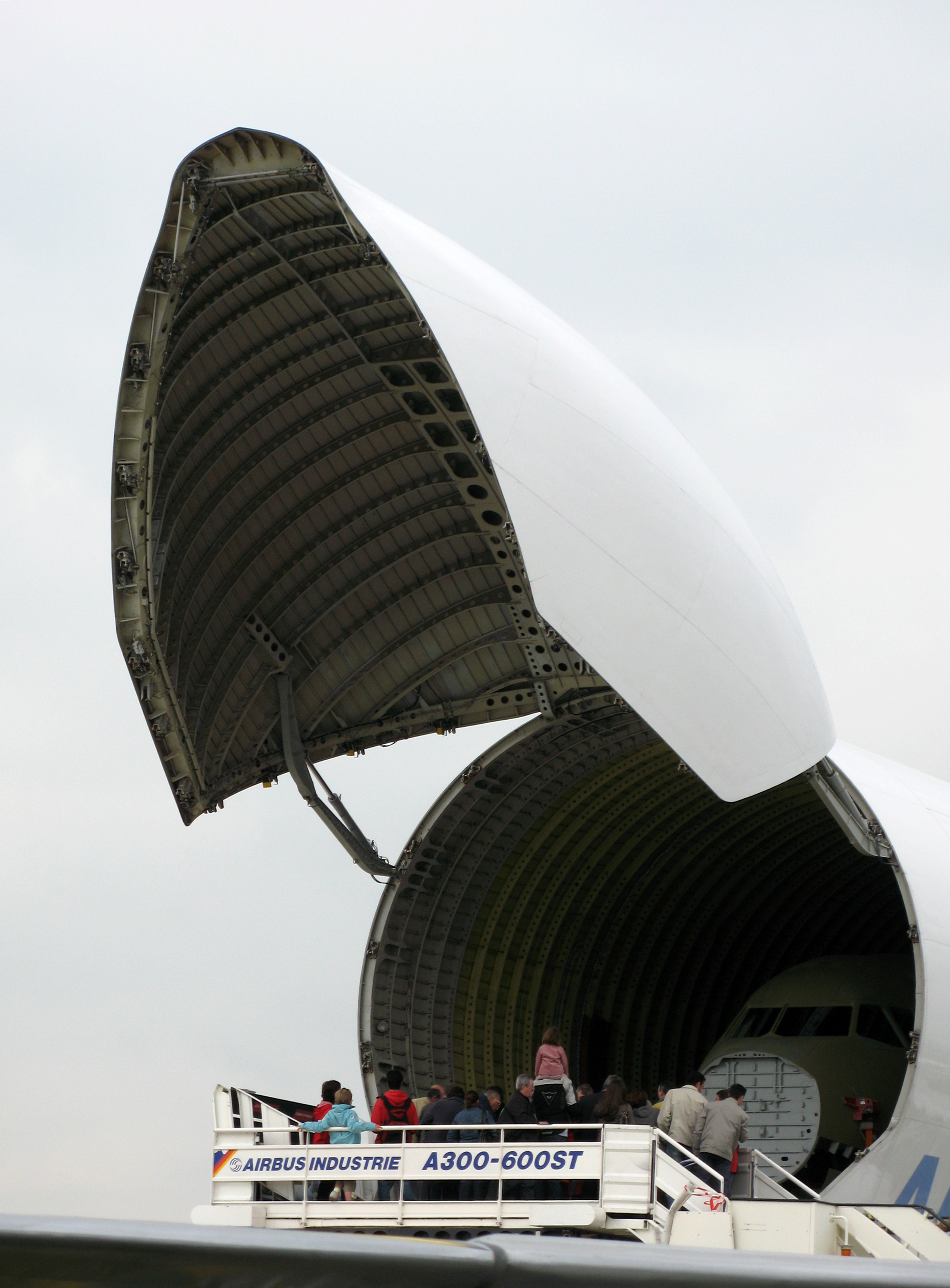
Upward-swinging hinged door

The A300-600ST Beluga shares many design similarities, although differing substantially in appearance, to the Airbus A300 upon which it was based. The wings, engines, landing gear, and the lower part of the fuselage remain identical to those used on the conventional A300, while the upper part of the fuselage forms an enormous horseshoe-shaped structure 7.7 m (25 ft) in diameter. In comparison with the Super Guppy, the payload was more than doubled and the volume increased by more than 30% The General Electric CF6-80C2 turbofan engines used are slightly uprated from those used on the standard A300 as well. The vertical stabilizer uses a modified A340 fin with a 1.12 m (3 ft 8 in) base extension while the tailplane was strengthened and fitted with auxiliary fins to maintain directional stability. The tailplane trim tank was also deleted.

To provide access to the cargo area from the front without having to disconnect all electrical, hydraulic and flight control connections (and also avoiding the lengthy recalibrations before each flight that reconnection entailed), the standard A300 cockpit was relocated down below the cargo-floor level. By relocating the cockpit in this manner, loading times were halved from those typically achieved with the Super Guppy, which had needed to disconnect and reconnect such systems. Another reason for faster loading times was the adoption of a roll-on/roll-off loading system, as well as the ability to unload the aircraft in winds of up to 40 knots. The qualities and improved capabilities of the Beluga resulted in the costs associated with transporting Airbus components dropping to one-third of those being incurred operating the Super Guppy.

The cockpit of the Beluga is pressurized but the cargo deck is not, making it inaccessible during flight and unsuitable for cargoes that require a pressurized environment, such as live animals. However, the cargo deck is fitted with a heating module to keep the cargo within an appropriate temperature range. On at least one occasion, a pressurized container has been used for cargo. The aircraft is operated by a crew of three – two pilots and a loadmaster.

The main deck cargo volume of the Beluga is greater than that of the C-5 Galaxy or the Antonov An-124, but still smaller than Antonov An-225. However, it is restricted by cargo-weight capacity of 47 tonnes, compared to 122.5 tonnes for the C-5 Galaxy and 150 tonnes for the An-124. Despite this width, the Beluga cannot carry most fuselage parts of the Airbus A380, which are instead normally transported by ship and road; nevertheless, some A380 components have been transported by Belugas.

== Operational history ==
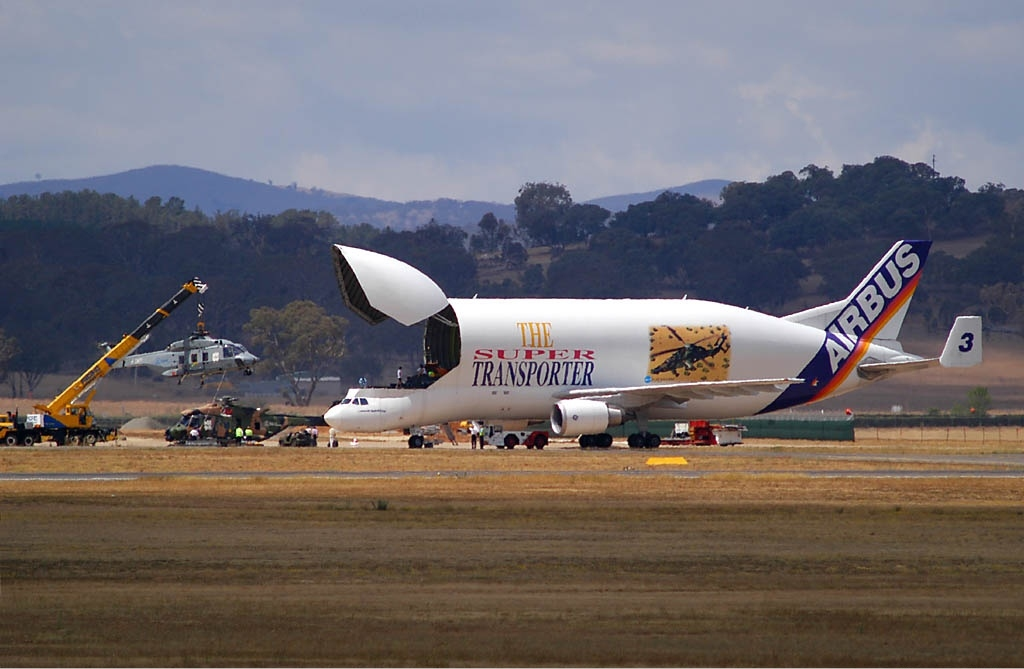
A BelugaST in early livery, 2003

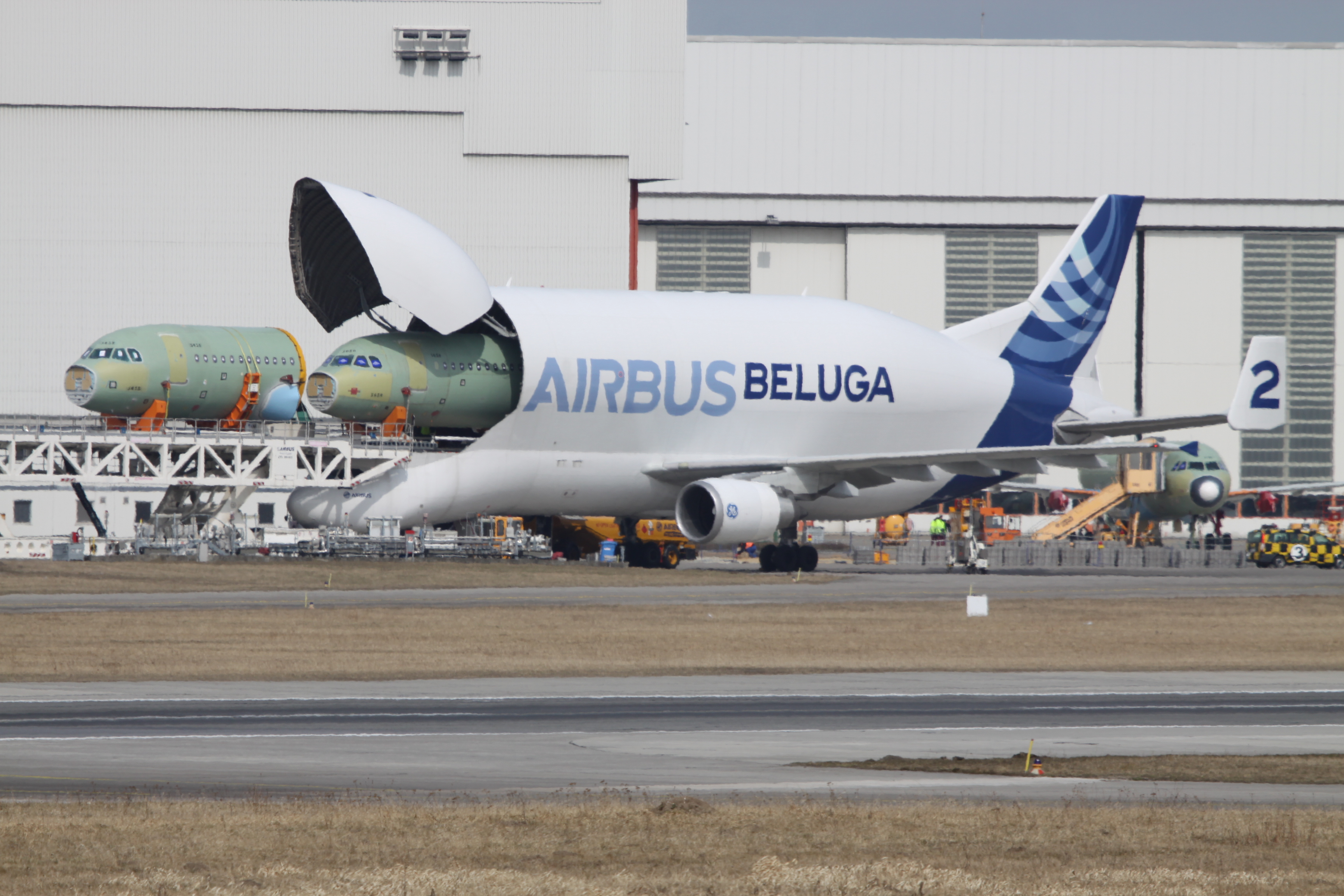
Fuselage nose sections being unloaded at Hamburg Finkenwerder, 2013

In January 1996, the Beluga formally entered service, ferrying components from various aerospace sites to the final assembly lines. The geographic location of Airbus manufacturing is not only influenced by cost and convenience; it is also a matter of aviation history and national interests. Traditionally, each of the Airbus partners makes an entire aircraft section, which would then be transported to a central location for final assembly; even after the integration of Airbus into a single firm, the arrangement had largely remained the same, with Airbus partners becoming subsidiaries or contractors of the multinational pan-European company. The details vary from one model to another, but the general arrangement is for the wings and landing gear to be made in the UK, the tail and doors in Spain, the fuselage in Germany, and the nose and centre-section in France, with final assembly in either Toulouse, France; Hamburg, Germany; or Seville, Spain. (Note: Narrowbody assembly is also carried out at Mobile, Alabama, in the U.S.)

On 24 October 1997, the last of Airbus's Super Guppy freighters was retired and its outsize cargo mission from that point onwards being exclusively performed by the new A300-600ST fleet. In 1997, the second year of Beluga operations, the fleet accumulated in excess of 2,500 flight hours across more than 1,400 flights. By 2012, the fleet was performing roughly 5,000 flight hours per year and further increases were being publicly anticipated by Airbus.

Various infrastructure upgrades have been made at multiple locations to better accommodate the Beluga, many of which being delivered after its entry to service. In 2011, Pau Pyrénées Airport, a site routinely visited by Belugas, became the first airport in Europe to deploy the European Geostationary Navigation Overlay Service, which accurately guides the Beluga and other aircraft during landing. In 2015, a dedicated Beluga loading station was opened at Hawarden Airport, preventing high winds from disrupting future operations. A two-bay loading dock was opened in Toulouse in 2019, receiving 85–100 flights per week, as the five A300-600STs are operated 7,600 hours a year together. By enclosing the forward section, including the open large cargo door, a faster one hour and 20 minutes turnaround, down from two hours and 30 minutes, could be achieved, along with reduced weather-related restrictions.

In addition to its primary supply duties to Airbus' production facilities, Belugas have often performed charter flights for various purposes. In 1997, ATI claimed that it had to reject eight out of ten requests for commercial Beluga flights, the fleet being able to spare only 130 flight hours for such duties that year. But as more Beluga aircraft were put into service, availability increased drastically, rising to 600 flight hours in 1998 and around 1,000 flight hours in 1999; this effectively enabled one of the five Beluga aircraft to spend much of its operating hours performing charter flights. Amongst the early customers chartering Beluga flights was Boeing.

In June 1997, a world record was set for the most voluminous payload to be carried by an aircraft when a Beluga was used to transport a chemical tank for a merchant vessel from Clermont-Ferrand to Le Havre, France. In February 2003, a single Beluga performed the farthest distance charter flight ever, having flown for 25 hours (not including refuelling stops) to transport two complete NHI NH90 helicopters along with a single Eurocopter Tiger attack helicopter from Marseille, France, to Melbourne, Australia, for the Avalon Airshow.

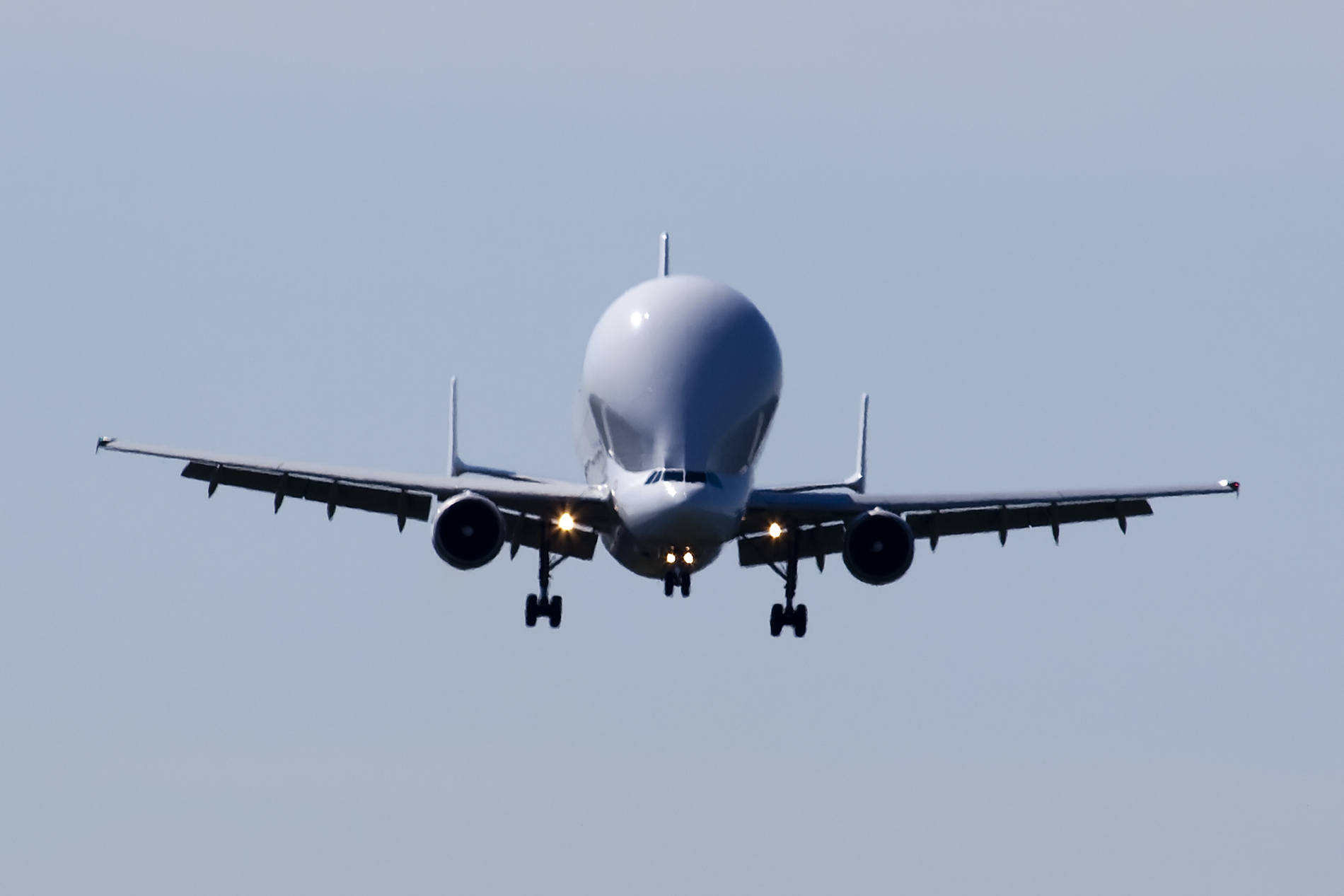
Front view of an inflight Beluga showing its bulbous fuselage

In 1999, a Beluga carried a large painting, Liberty Leading the People by Eugène Delacroix, which had hung in the Louvre in Paris since 1874. It was flown from Paris to Tokyo via Bahrain and Kolkata in about 20 hours. The large canvas, measuring 2.99 metres (9.81 ft) high by 3.62 metres (11.88 ft) long, was too large to fit into a Boeing 747. It was transported in the vertical position inside a special pressurized container provided with isothermal protection and an anti-vibration device.

In 2004, a Beluga delivered relief supplies to the Indian Ocean region following widespread devastation of coastal areas by a major tsunami. In 2005, the type transported humanitarian aid and medical supplies from the United Kingdom and France to the Gulf Coast of the United States as part of disaster relief efforts in the aftermath of Hurricane Katrina.

The Beluga has seen recurrent use to transport bulky objects, including vehicles, for various different space programs. In 2001, sections of the unmanned Automated Transfer Vehicle (ATV) space vehicle were transported by a Beluga from Turin, Italy, to Amsterdam, Netherlands. In 2004, multiple Beluga flights were made to Baikonur Cosmodrome, Kazakhstan, to deliver Astrium-built satellites. In 2009, a Beluga was used to convey the Tranquility module of the International Space Station from Turin to Kennedy Space Center, United States.

On 25 January 2022, Airbus announced an airline offering outsize cargo transportation called Airbus Beluga Transport. The airline was established as an alternative use for the Beluga fleet, after it was withdrawn from Airbus’s internal logistics network following the introduction of the BelugaXL. Airbus Beluga Transport saw demand after sanctions imposed after the invasion of Ukraine in 2022 affected Russian-operated Antonov An-124 services and the destruction of the sole Antonov An-225; the company stated that it foresaw in excess of 150 such flights being performed annually. In September 2022, Airbus began testing a new loading system for handling outsized military cargo with the BelugaST fleet. A verification exercise was conducted with the German armed forces, the system's first customer, during which a Sikorsky CH-53 Sea Stallion military transport helicopter was loaded into a Beluga. All five aircraft were retired from Airbus service in 2023. In January 2025, Airbus decided to close its Beluga Transport operations after just 14 months of getting its own AOC. The first aircraft was retired from operational service on 29 January 2026, and the others are expected to be withdrawn by 2027.

== Specifications (A300-600ST) ==
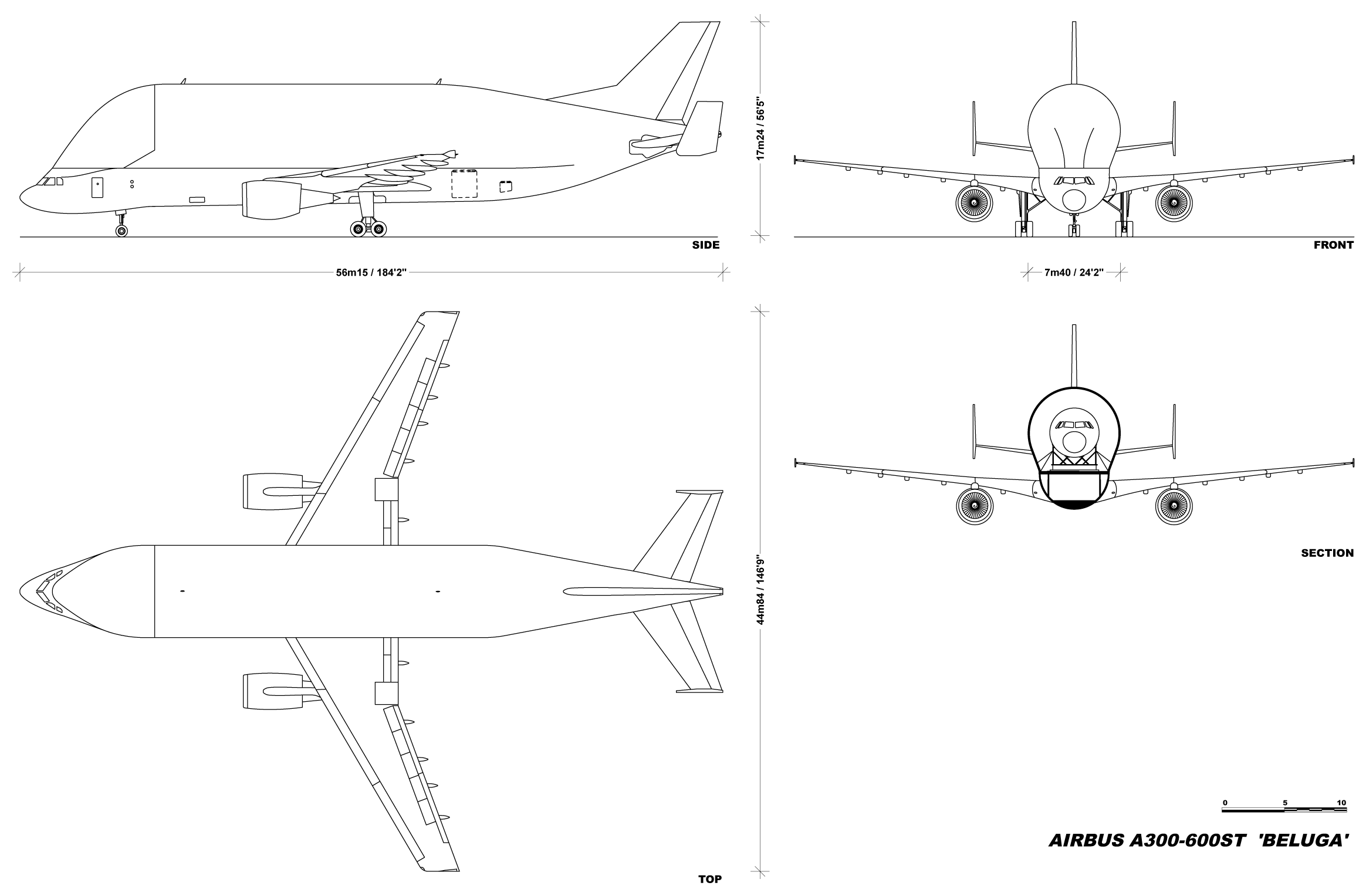

Data from Airbus, Airbus: Beluga

General characteristics

- Crew: 2
- Capacity: 47,000 kg (103,617 lb) typical load
- Length: 56.15 m (184 ft 3 in)
- Wingspan: 44.84 m (147 ft 1 in)
- Height: 17.24 m (56 ft 7 in)
- Wing area: 260 m^{2} (2,800 sq ft)
- Empty weight: 86,500 kg (190,700 lb)
- Max takeoff weight: 155,000 kg (341,717 lb)
- Fuel capacity: 23,860 L (6,303 US gal; 5,248 imp gal)
- Fuselage external diameter: 7.31 m (24 ft) (including lower fuselage)
- Cargo cross-section diameter: 7.1 m (23 ft 4 in) in cargo compartment
- Cargo hold – volume 1,500 m^{3} (53,000 cu ft), 37.7 m (124 ft) long × 7.04 m (23.1 ft) wide × 7.08 m (23.2 ft) tall
- Powerplant: 2 × General Electric CF6-80C2A8 turbofan, 257 kN (58,000 lbf) thrust each

Performance

- Maximum speed: Mach 0.7 Maximum Operating Mach – MMO
- Range: 2,779 km (1,727 mi, 1,501 nmi) with 40 t (88,000 lb) payload – 4,632 km (2,501 nmi; 2,878 mi) with 26 t (57,000 lb) payload
- Service ceiling: 10,668 m (35,000 ft)

== See also ==
- List of civil aircraft

Related development

- Airbus A300 – World's first twin-engine widebody jet airliner
- Airbus BelugaXL – 2020 large cargo aircraft

Aircraft of comparable role, configuration, and era

- Aero Spacelines Pregnant Guppy – Outsize cargo conversion of the Boeing 377 Stratocruiser
- Aero Spacelines Super Guppy – Larger turboprop version of outsize cargo aircraft Pregnant Guppy
- Antonov An-124 Ruslan – Soviet military transport aircraft
- Antonov An-225 Mriya – Soviet/Ukrainian heavy strategic cargo aircraft
- Boeing Dreamlifter – Outsize cargo conversion of the 747-400
