= Conroy Skymonster =

Canadian cargo airliner conversion with 4 turboprop engines, 1969

Skymonster
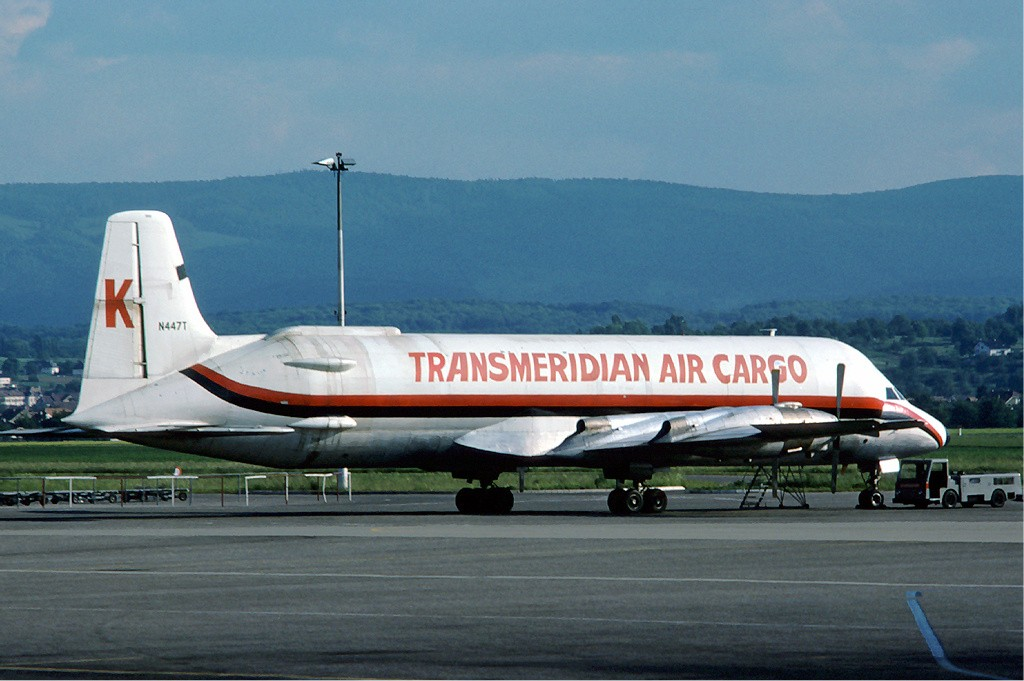

General information
- Type: Large outsize-cargo transport aircraft
- Manufacturer: Conroy Aircraft
- Status: Retired
- Primary users: Heavylift Cargo Transmeridian Air Cargo
- Number built: 1
- Registration: N447T, EI-BND, 4K-GUP, 9G-LCA, RP-C8023, N447FT

History
- First flight: 1969
- In service: 1970-1999, 2013-2022
- Developed from: Canadair CL-44

The Conroy Skymonster (CL-44-O) was a 1960s specialized cargo aircraft based on the Canadair CL-44 freighter, with an outsized fuselage. It was a follow-on by the designer of the Aero Spacelines Guppy series of aircraft. The "O" stood for outsized fuselage.

== Design and development ==
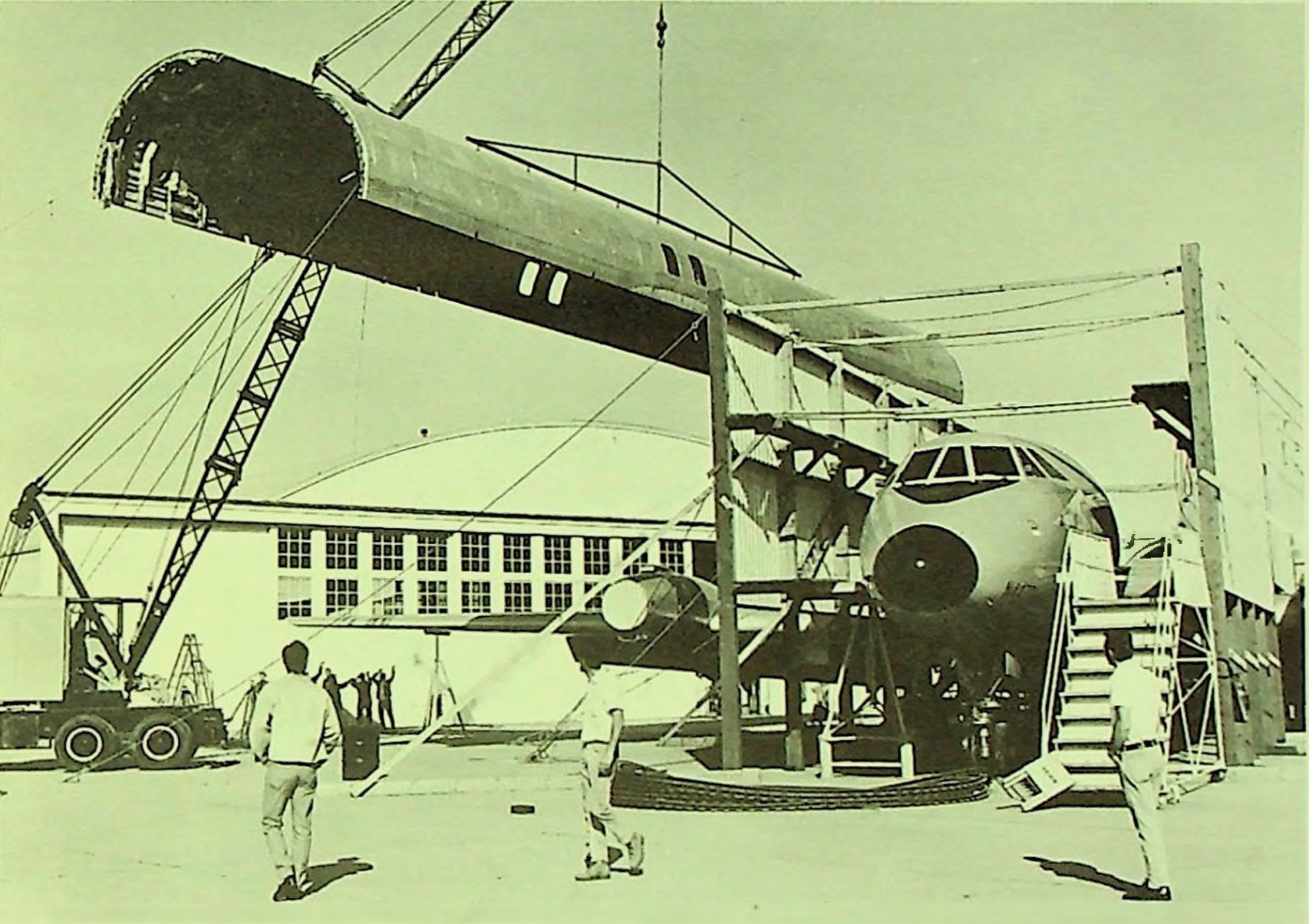
Under construction in 1969, upper fuselage being removed

John M. Conroy had earlier been the founder of Aero Spacelines, which had created the Guppy series of aircraft designed to carry outsize cargo based on the C-97 platform, which were instrumental in the NASA Apollo Program.

The Skymonster was the same general concept, but based on the Canadair CL-44 platform. The aircraft was designed as a transport aircraft that could be used to ferry three Rolls-Royce RB.211 jet engines from Belfast, Northern Ireland, to Palmdale, California, United States. The engines were to be installed on the Lockheed L-1011 TriStar airliner. Flying Tiger Line, which at the time owned a majority of CL-44D freighters, and had an interest in creating demand for them, had a 25% stake in the program and supplied equipment and personnel to Conroy.

In 1969 Conroy and the CL-44-O lost a bidding contest for RB.211 transport to Saturn Airways flying the Lockheed L-100-30 Hercules (civilian version of the C-130) (Canada's Pacific Western Airlines (PWA) initially won the competition but the UK government refused PWA access to the UK). Conroy complained to an appeals court about the outcome on anti-trust grounds (Lockheed making both the L-1011 and the Hercules), but the Civil Aeronautics Board (CAB; which tightly regulated the US airline business at the time), directed by the appeals court to investigate and explain the anti-trust aspects, saw nothing untoward, noting that in the end, Saturn's bid was lower, and Saturn was interested in the L-100 apart from the L-1011 program: it needed a new aircraft type to once again make it competitive in US military charter bidding.

The Skymonster was derived from a Canadair CL-44 freighter, in turn a derivative of the Bristol Britannia. It features an enlarged fuselage, like the Aero Spacelines Mini Guppy, which was produced by Jack Conroy's previous company, Aero Spacelines.

The conversion was performed outdoors, under covered scaffolding, at the Santa Barbara, California (SBA) airport. The nose section was built using foam covered with fiberglass, while the larger fuselage was constructed using conventional aluminum structure.

== Operational history ==
The Skymonster first flew on 26 November 1969, under the US registration "N447T". The CL-44 from which it had been converted also bore this same registration, and was previously operated by the Flying Tiger Line.

Only one prototype was built. Another one was ordered, but the CL-44 on which it was to be based crashed before delivery.

In 1970, the prototype was leased by Transmeridian Air Cargo, who gave it the name "Skymonster". Despite its being renamed "Bahamas Trader" later on, the name Skymonster stuck, and it is now commonly known as this.

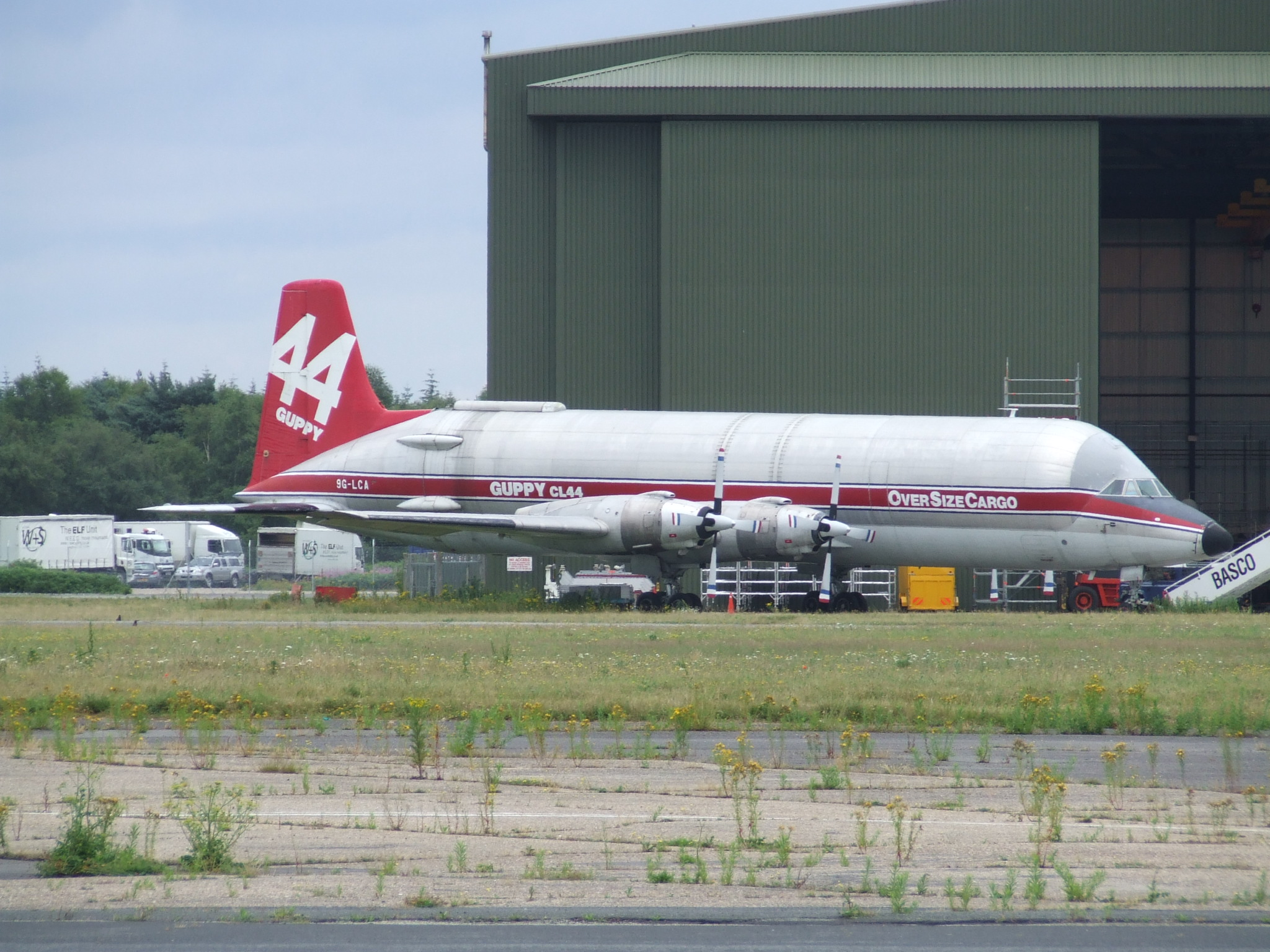
The Skymonster at Bournemouth when it was registered as 9G-LCA

In 1978, it was bought by British Cargo Airlines.

In 1982, it went to HeavyLift Cargo Airlines, who re-registered it with the Irish registration EI-BND.

The aircraft went into storage in 1993, but was bought by a leasing company only two months later and leased to Buffalo Airways.

Its next lease was to Azerbaijan Airlines in 1997, under the registration 4K-GUP.

In March 1998, it was leased to Baku Express.

In August 1998 it went to First International Airlines and was registered 9G-LCA.

In 1999, it was placed into storage, initially in the US, but then it was flown to Bournemouth Airport, UK, where it was scheduled to be scrapped.

In December 2006 the aircraft was registered in the Philippines (RP-C8023) and was being prepared for service in Australia. As of March 2008, the Skymonster was still at Hurn. In August 2008, it was reported that the aircraft was in the process of being scrapped, however as of September this was on hold amid further rumours about donation to a museum in Germany.

On 14 January 2010, Bournemouth International Airport Limited offered the aircraft for sale in The London Gazette.

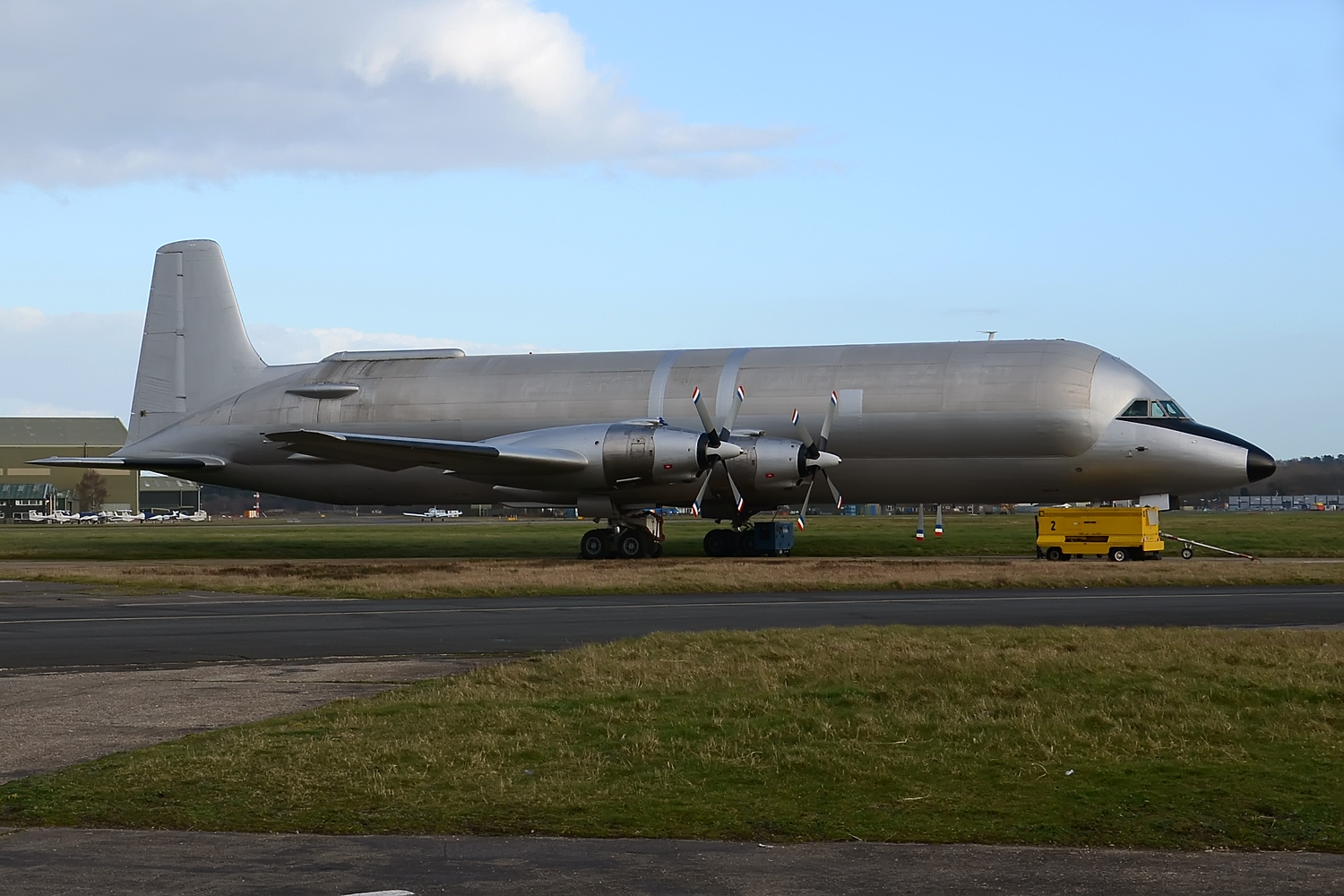
N447FT at Bournemouth in 2014.

After a long period of storage, activity was again seen around the Skymonster during the summer of 2013. In July 2013 it was registered N447FT in the United States to a Jordan Harlan Wayne, but has since been deregistered in 2022.

As of 21 May 2021 the Skymonster remains at Bournemouth International Airport, moved from its original parking spot to make way for airport development.

On 2 December 2024, the Bournemouth Aviation Museum announced via Facebook that the Skymonster was to be broken up starting that same week.

== See also ==
- Aero Spacelines
- Super Guppy
- Boeing Dreamlifter
- Airbus Beluga
- Aviation Traders ATL-98 Carvair
