= Perry Young =

Perry Young may refer to:

- Perry Young (aviator) (1919–1998), American aviator
- Perry Young (basketball) (born 1963), American retired basketball player
