= Soviet airspace violations =

A Soviet airspace violation may refer to:

- The hundreds of Nazi prewar incursions into Soviet airspace before Operation Barbarossa
- 1960 U-2 incident when a spy plane was shot down over Soviet airspace
- Seaboard World Airlines Flight 253, a 1968 forced landing on Etorofu Island
- Korean Air Lines Flight 902, a 1978 forced landing on a frozen Soviet lake near Finnish border
- Korean Air Lines Flight 007, 1983 shootdown of a Boeing 747 over Sakhalin Island
- Mathias Rust, landing a Cessna 172 in Red Square
