= 1966 Flying Tiger Line Canadair CL-44 crash =

1966 air accident

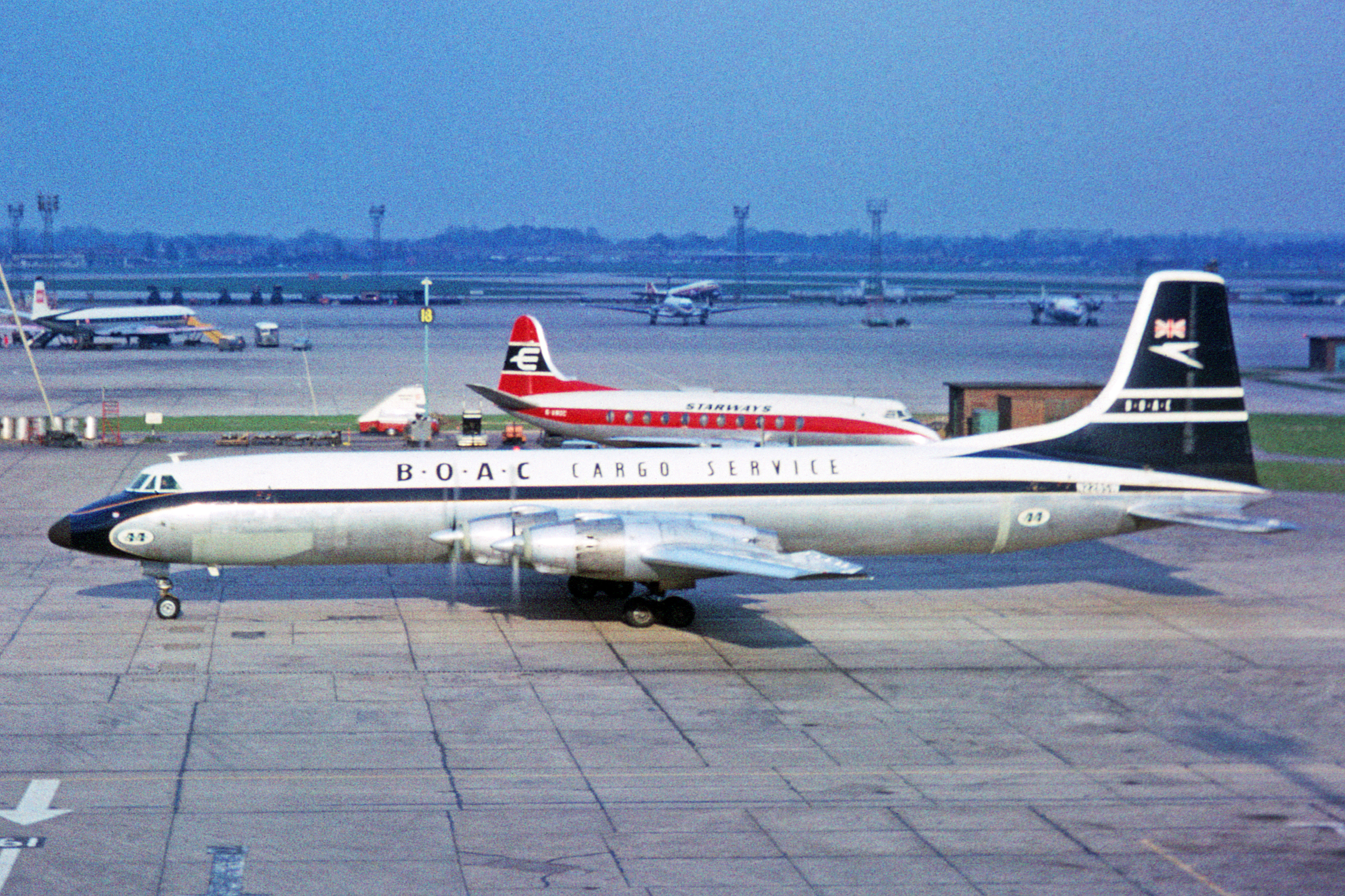
- N228SW, while still on lease with BOAC

Accident
- Date: 24 December 1966
- Summary: Controlled flight into terrain due to pilot error
- Site: Da Nang, South Vietnam
- Total fatalities: 111
- Total injuries: 50

Aircraft
- Aircraft type: Canadair CL-44
- Operator: Flying Tiger Line
- Registration: N228SW
- Flight origin: Tachikawa Air Force Base, Tachikawa, Japan
- Destination: Da Nang Airport, Da Nang, South Vietnam
- Occupants: 4
- Passengers: 0
- Crew: 4
- Fatalities: 4
- Survivors: 0

Ground casualties
- Ground fatalities: 107
- Ground injuries: 50

On December 24, 1966, a Flying Tiger Line Canadair CL-44 flying from Tachikawa Air Force Base in Japan to Da Nang Airport struck an obstacle, stalled, and crashed into Binh Thai village, killing all four crew members and 107 people on the ground. The flight was on a subcontract for the United States Air Force. This was the first fatal accident for the CL-44 and the deadliest as well. (Note: The final death toll as shown in the accident report was found to be 111, including the 4 crew. The other counts are incorrect)

== Aircraft ==
The aircraft was a Canadair CL-44D4-1 with the serial number 31. The aircraft had its first flight on April 16, 1962 under the registration of CF-OFH-X. It was delivered to Seaboard World Airlines under the registration N228SW. It was leased to BOAC from September 30, 1963 to October 31, 1965, when it was returned to Seaboard World Airlines. From November 3, 1965, it was leased to Flying Tiger Line. The aircraft had a swing tail configuration with four Rolls-Royce Tyne 515 turboprop engines. A crew of four were aboard the aircraft.

== Accident ==
The aircraft approached Da Nang Airport in rain and foggy conditions and low fuel tanks. The aircraft was on a flight carrying munitions and cargo for the United States Air Force. As the fuel tanks were near empty, aborting the landing was rendered impossible. At 19:15 local time, a kilometer south of the runway, the plane clipped trees and crashed into the village of Binh Thai, plowing through 55 thatched huts over a distance of 275 meters. All four crew members were killed and 107 people were killed on the ground. 50 people on the ground were injured, 19 of them seriously.

== Cause ==
The cause of the accident was a controlled flight into terrain. It was thought that the crew continued the approach under the glide path, probably due to the poor weather conditions during the flight. This resulted in the crash.
