= Tradewinds Airways =

British cargo airline

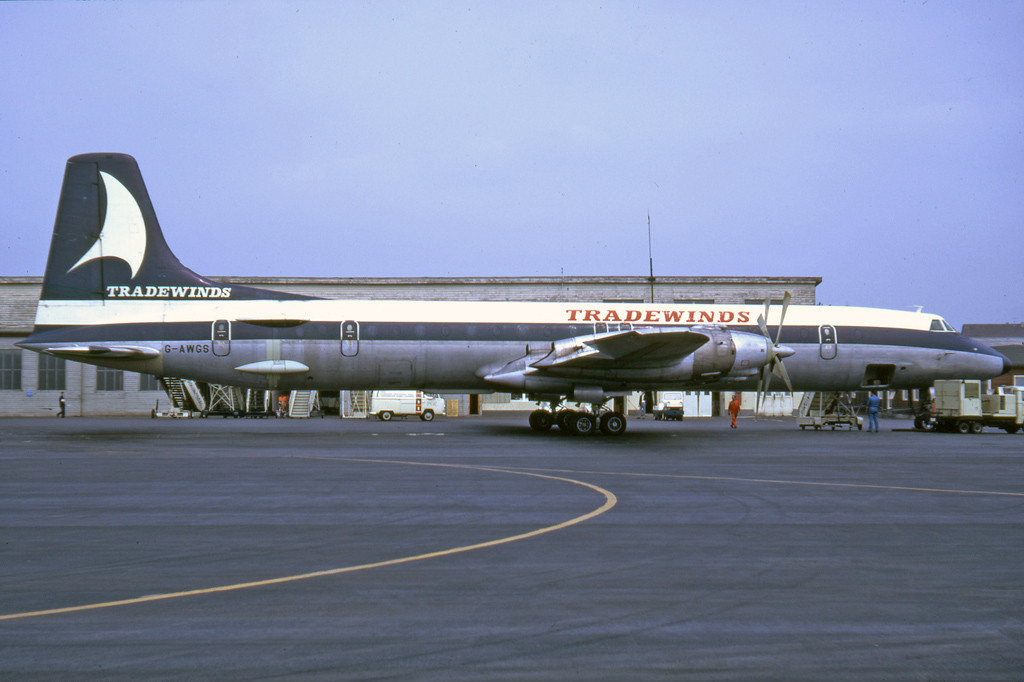
- Canadair CL-44D-4
IATA	ICAO	Call sign
IK	IKA	TRADEWINDS
- Founded: November 1968 (as Bobwood)
- Commenced operations: 1969 (as Tradewinds Airways)
- Ceased operations: 1990
- Headquarters: London–Gatwick

Tradewinds Airways Ltd. was a British all-cargo airline. Its head office was located in Timberham House, on the ground of London Gatwick Airport in Crawley, England.

== History ==
Tradewinds was founded in November 1968 after the collapse of Transglobe Airways under the name Bobwood Ltd. to flew charter flights from London Gatwick (LGW) airport, using Canadair CL-44-D4 aircraft previously operated by Transglobe.

In January 1969 the name was changed to Tradewinds Airways Ltd. but since Seaboard World Airlines (a USA air carrier) had a large interest in Tradewinds, the British Government would not issue a license. By April 1969 the majority of the stock was transferred to British nationals and the airline was able to start operations.

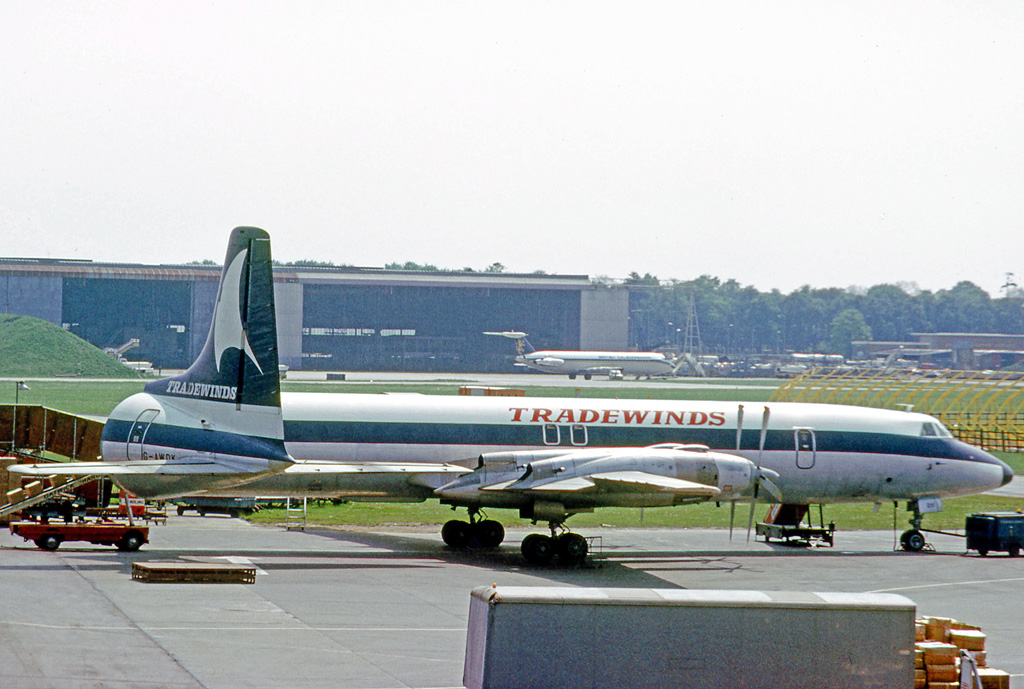
Canadair CL-44D-4 at London Gatwick Airport in 1974 with the rear fuselage swung open to allow oversize freight loading

Tradewinds flew a lot of relief flights to Nigeria during the civil war with Biafra and that allowed the company to expand in Africa, the Middle East and the Far East. Tradewinds also flew numerous flights for the UK Ministry of Defence. These military flights included the transport of missiles to the NATO arctic test ranges. Tradewinds also held the exclusive contract for the movement of Formula One racing cars. As part of this operation, charter services would be arranged for two of the CL-44's in South America and flight and ground crews were stationed in Brasil for two weeks each year whilst the Grand Prix were taking place.

Tradewinds was also a specialist carrier of bloodstock, pioneering the use of special stalls that allowed horse to travel safely and without stress. Many champion race horses were transported in this way. Other livestock transport was also undertaken including sheep, goats and pigs. Tradewinds ran its own warehouse at London Gatwick Airport, a privilege accorded only to British Caledonian and British Airways. All other airlines had to use either Gatwick Handling services or one of these other carriers for handling.

=== Jetliners and schedules ===
In 1977 the company was taken over by the Lonrho Group and began to replace the CL44's with second-hand Boeing 707-320C freighters. With these jetliners, flights to Chicago and Toronto were begun. A December 1983 Tradewinds timetable lists scheduled weekly nonstop flights between London Gatwick Airport and Chicago O'Hare Airport and also between London Stansted Airport and Khartoum as well as "split charter services" flights between London Gatwick and Accra (operated on behalf of Gemini Airlines) and also between London Stansted and Kano, Lagos, Mogadishu, Nairobi and Port Harcourt.

Tradewinds previously operated twice-weekly scheduled services to Larnaca in Cyprus on behalf of Cyprus Airways, which eventually were operated by that carrier when they purchased a CL-44. Tradewinds then acted as the General Sales Agent, Flight Operations Department and Warehouse for scheduled cargo flying to Cyprus on Cyprus Airways' services. Although this carrier held licences for services from Cyprus to many other destinations in the Middle East, including one to Dubai that regularly appeared in international schedule guides, the economics were insufficient for these services to take place. These services were part of a major export drive by the Cypriot Government to supply northern Europe with fresh fruit and vegetable produce every night. As such, services would operate via Basle and occasionally Manchester. Experience gained from these operations was utilised in Tradewinds' own scheduled operations, which led to the formation of another joint venture, Sudan Air Cargo with Sudan Airways, to operate twice-weekly Boeing 707 freighter services from London Gatwick to Khartoum.

With the new services, the company grew to be the largest British pure cargo airline during the early 80's, but the Lonrho Group ran into financial trouble and was forced to sell Tradewinds to Homac Aviation. Lack of capital did not allow the 707 aircraft to be replaced when they became subject to new noise regulations and the airline ceased operations on 28 September 1990.

From 1981 to 1990, the airline was identified by the Bureau of Transportation Statistics code IKQ.

== Fleet ==
The fleet comprised six Canadair CL-44 and nine Boeing 707-320C.

== See also ==
- List of defunct airlines of the United Kingdom
