= IAS Cargo Airlines =

British airline (1967–1980)

International Aviation Services/IAS Cargo Airlines
IATA	ICAO	Call sign
FF	—	—
- Founded: 1966
- Commenced operations: 1972
- Ceased operations: 1979 (merged to form British Cargo)
- Hubs: London Gatwick

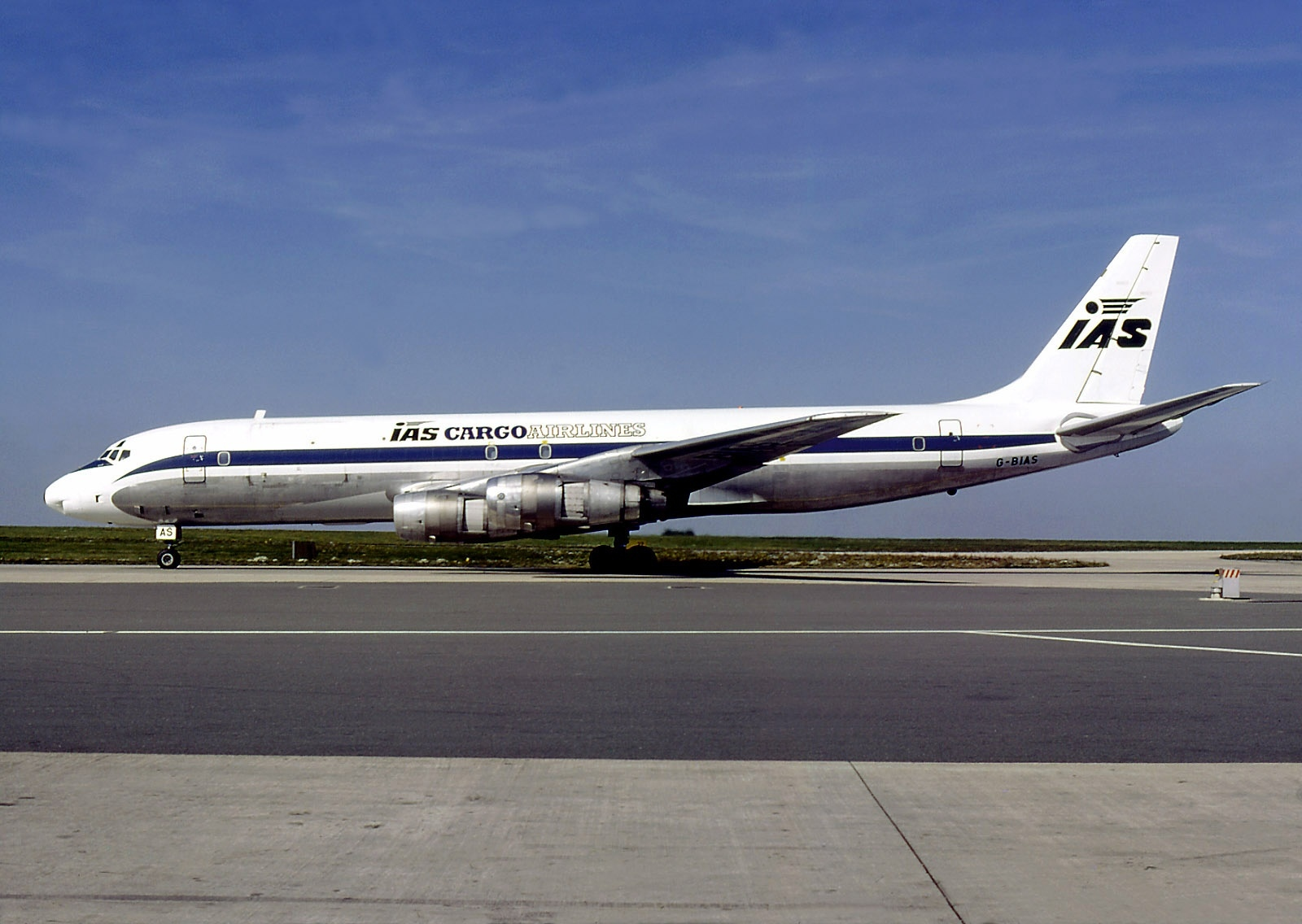
Douglas DC-8-55 at Paris-Charles de Gaulle airport in 1978

International Aviation Services, trading as IAS Cargo Airlines from April 1975, was a wholly privately owned independent (Note: independent from government-owned corporations) British airline that was based at London Gatwick Airport in the United Kingdom. It commenced operations in 1967, and with own aircraft from June 1972. In the month of August 1979 it merged with London Stansted based Transmeridian Air Cargo (TMAC) to form the short-lived British Cargo Airlines.

== History ==
=== Beginning ===
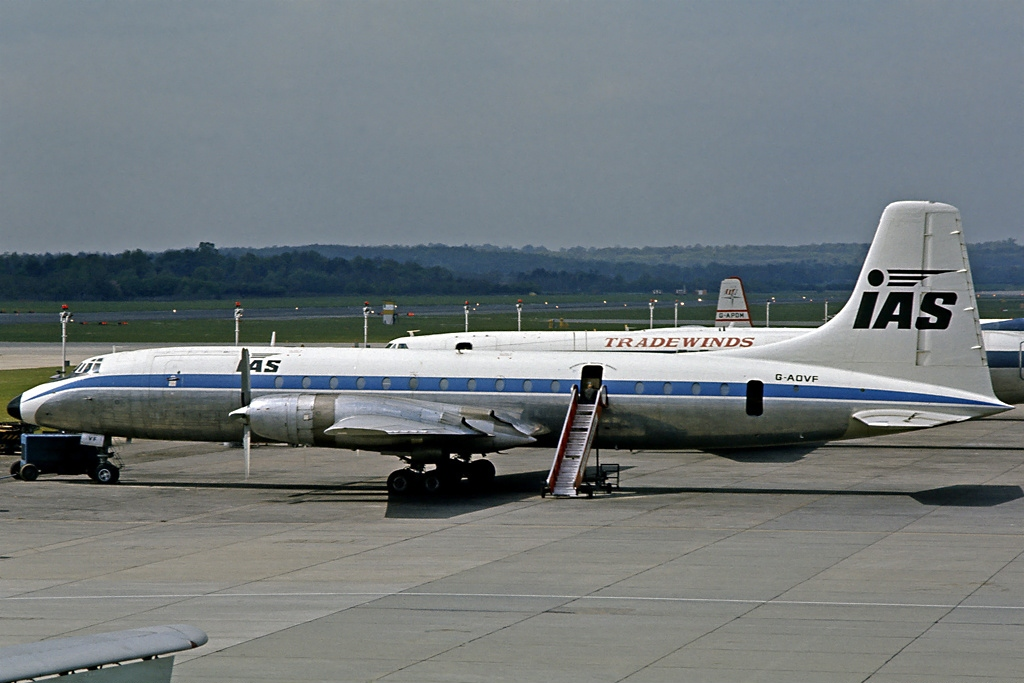
Bristol Britannia serie 300F at Gatwick airport in 1973

International Aviation Services Ltd. was formed in 1966 as an air transport consultancy. It commenced worldwide cargo charters from London Gatwick in 1967 with leased Bristol Britannia 300F turboprop aircraft. (Note: these aircraft comprised two former Caledonian Britannia 314s acquired from British Caledonian Airways in 1971 (one of which entered service while the other was used for spares)) It began replacing leased aircraft with its own ones in 1971. It got its own air operator's certificate (AOC) in June 1972 in the name of International Aviation Services (UK) Ltd. and adopted IAS Cargo Airlines trading name in April 1975.

IAS Cargo Airlines acquired additional, second-hand Britannia turboprop (converted to freighters) as well as a Canadair CL-44 "swing tail" freighter during the early 1970s to expand its fleet to cope with growing worldwide demand for freight services.

=== Jet operations ===
When, from the early 1970s, the world's major scheduled airlines began re-equipping their fleets with new generation widebodied jet aircraft a growing number of older generation, narrow-bodied jetliners, such as the Boeing 707 and the Douglas DC-8, became available on the second-hand market at prices smaller airlines that were lacking the resources to invest in new equipment could afford.

IAS Cargo became one of these airlines that took advantage of this situation by purchasing the first DC-8-50F jet freighter in 1974 with which operations commenced the following year. As business continued to expand, another DC-8-50Fs was added to the fleet during the second half of the 1970s. By the end of the decade the company's fleet mainly consisted of DC-8-50Fs.

In those years it was getting a growing number of air freight consignments that were shipped to Gatwick airport from the "other side" of the Channel. In October 1978 IAS Cargo introduced its first larger capacity, a stretched DC-8 Super 60 series freighter, a leased model 62CF.

=== Merging with a rival ===
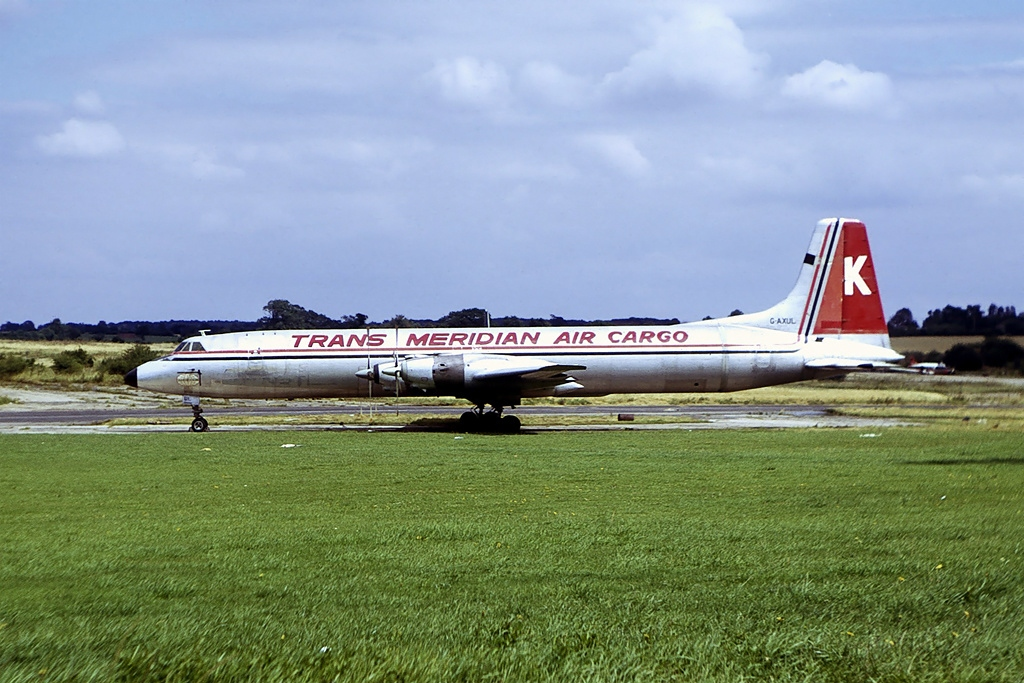
TMAC Canadair CL-44D4

Stansted-based Trans Meridian Air Cargo (TMAC), another small independent British all-cargo operator wholly owned by Trafalgar House subsidiary Cunard Steamship Co, had come into being in 1962. TMAC also operated a similar aircraft fleet consisting of the same aircraft types, including a pair of DC-8Fs. Therefore, combining both companies' businesses to achieve greater operational synergies as well as to attain greater economies of scale seemed to be the next "logical" step to ensure survival in a competitive market place dominated by bigger, more powerful rivals.

IAS Cargo Airlines merged with TMAC on 15 August 1979 to create British Cargo Airlines Ltd., which began trading under its new name five days later. The merged entity's fleet comprised 15 aircraft, including eight DC-8 freighters, six CL-44-D and one CL-44-0 turboprop freighters. The jets were based at Gatwick while the turboprops were stationed at Stansted.

=== Closure and causes of collapse ===
The newly created British Cargo Airlines didn't even last a year: it folded in March 1980. The main reasons for the combined airline collapse included:

- A deep recession in Britain, which affected UK-based manufacturing companies that were the airline's main customers. This caused a slump in those companies' output of manufactured goods and led to a collapse in demand for specialist air freight services.
- Steeply rising jet fuel prices in the aftermath of the fall of the Shah of Iran. This increased the operating costs of relatively fuel-thirsty narrow-bodied jet freighters such as the Boeing 707 and the DC-8 (compared with more fuel-efficient widebodied freighters).
- A big influx of long-haul widebodied aircraft capacity into the fleets of British Airways and British Caledonian, Britain's two principal scheduled airlines at the time, as well as their main overseas competitors' fleets during the late 1970s/early 1980s. This resulted in a major increase in bellyhold cargo capacity that cost freight forwarders and shippers less to fill (compared with the higher rates that were required to fill narrow-bodied pure freighters profitably).

== Incidents and accidents ==
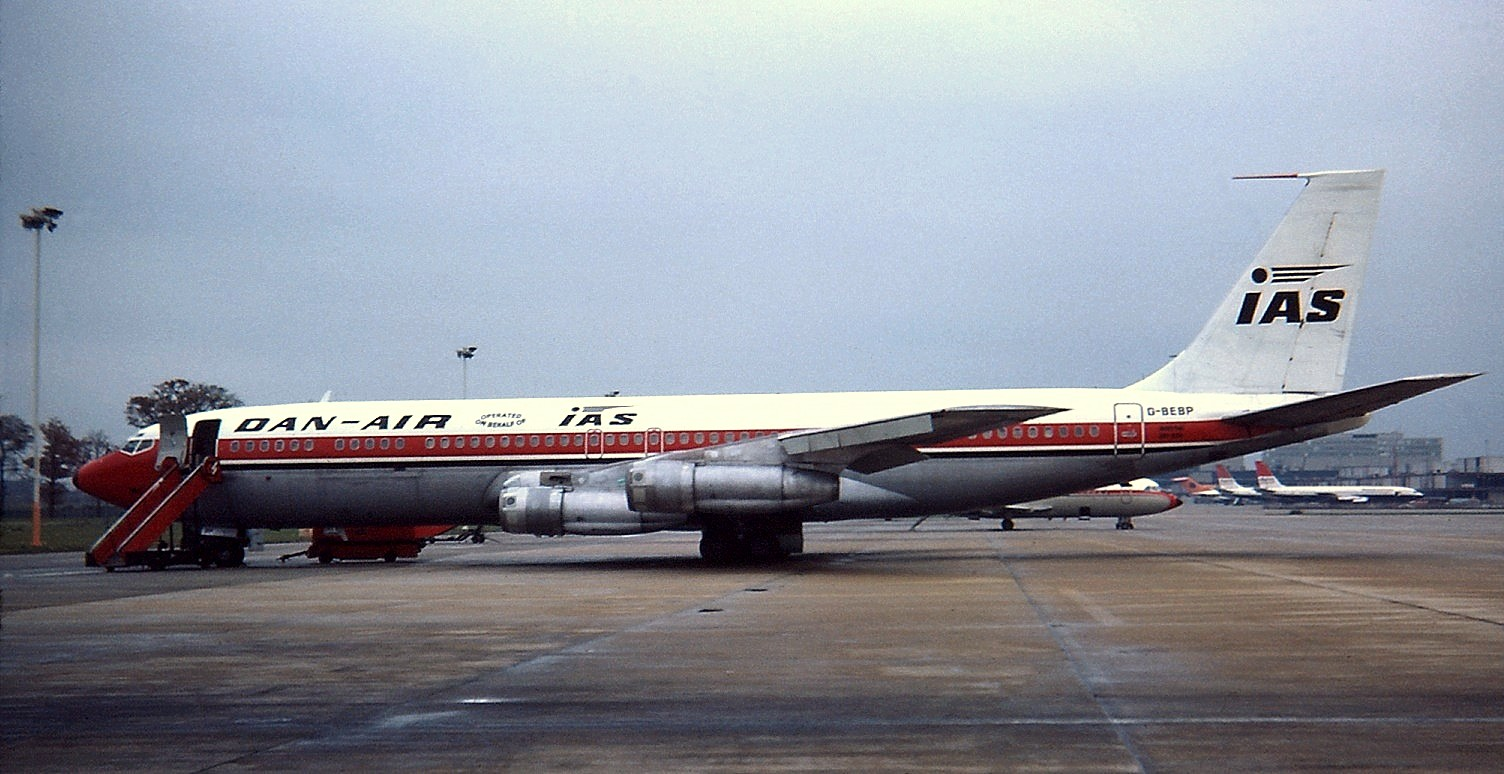
Dan-Air/IAS Cargo Boeing 707

In 1977 IAS Cargo Airlines became indirectly involved in a fatal accident causing the loss of an aircraft bearing its name as part of a hybrid colour scheme. This hybrid colour scheme combined parts of IAS Cargo Airlines' livery with that of Dan-Air Services Ltd, one of the leading wholly privately owned, independent British airlines that was the owner and operator of the crashed aircraft.

The accident itself involved one of Dan-Air's Boeing 707-321C freighters (registration G-BEBP), which IAS Cargo Airlines had operated under a so-called "wet lease" arrangement with Dan-Air, whereby the latter was providing the aircraft as well as flight crews and maintenance support under contract to the former. Some air accident databases wrongly cite IAS Cargo Airlines as the operator of the aircraft involved in this accident despite Dan-Air being that aircraft's actual operator , The mentioned aircraft crashed on 14 May 1977 during the final approach to Lusaka Airport at the end of a non-scheduled all-cargo flight from London Heathrow via Athens and Nairobi when its right-hand horizontal stabiliser separated as a result of metal fatigue, causing a loss of pitch control and killing all six occupants.

A major industry debate on the maintenance requirements as well as service life limitations of high-time "geriatric" jets ensued as a result of this accident.

(For further details see 1977 Dan-Air Boeing 707 crash.)

== See also ==
- List of defunct airlines of the United Kingdom

== Notes and citations ==
Notes

Citations
