= 1981 Armenia mid-air collision =

Fatal aircraft accident over Soviet Armenia

Accident
- Date: 18 July 1981
- Summary: Mid-air collision, Deliberate ram attack (Soviet claims)
- Site: Near Yerevan, Armenian Soviet Socialist Republic; 40.1°N 44.0°E
- Total fatalities: 4
- Total survivors: 1

First aircraft
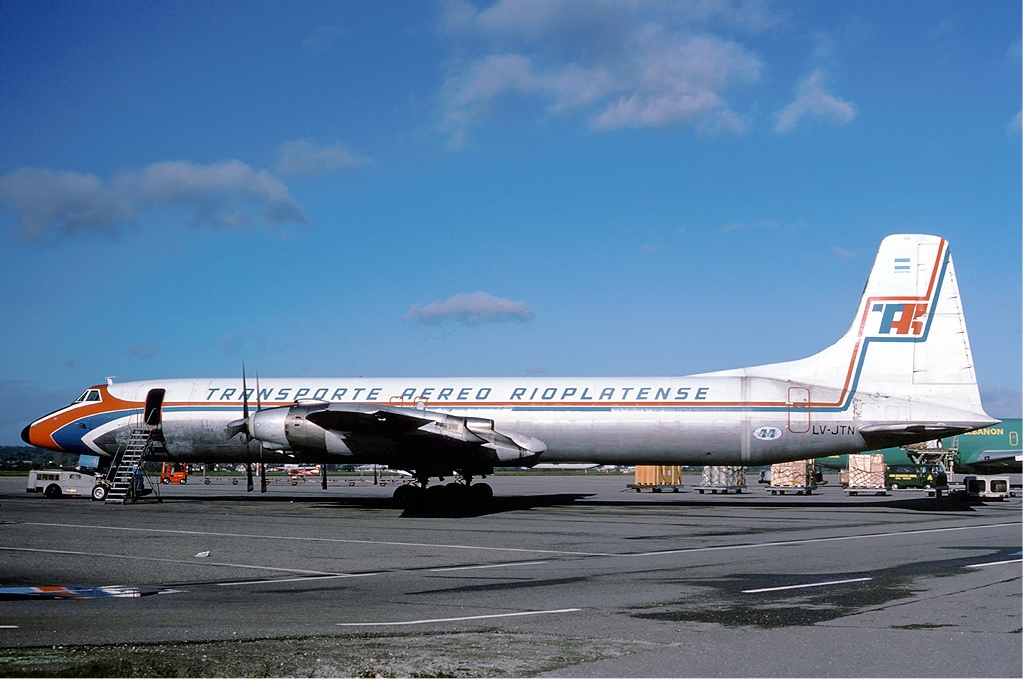
- LV-JTN, the Canadair CL-44 involved in the accident at Basle Airport in October 1976.
- Type: Canadair CL-44
- Operator: Transporte Aéreo Rioplatense
- Registration: LV-JTN
- Flight origin: Tehran, Iran
- Destination: Larnaca, Cyprus
- Passengers: 1
- Crew: 3
- Survivors: 0

Second aircraft
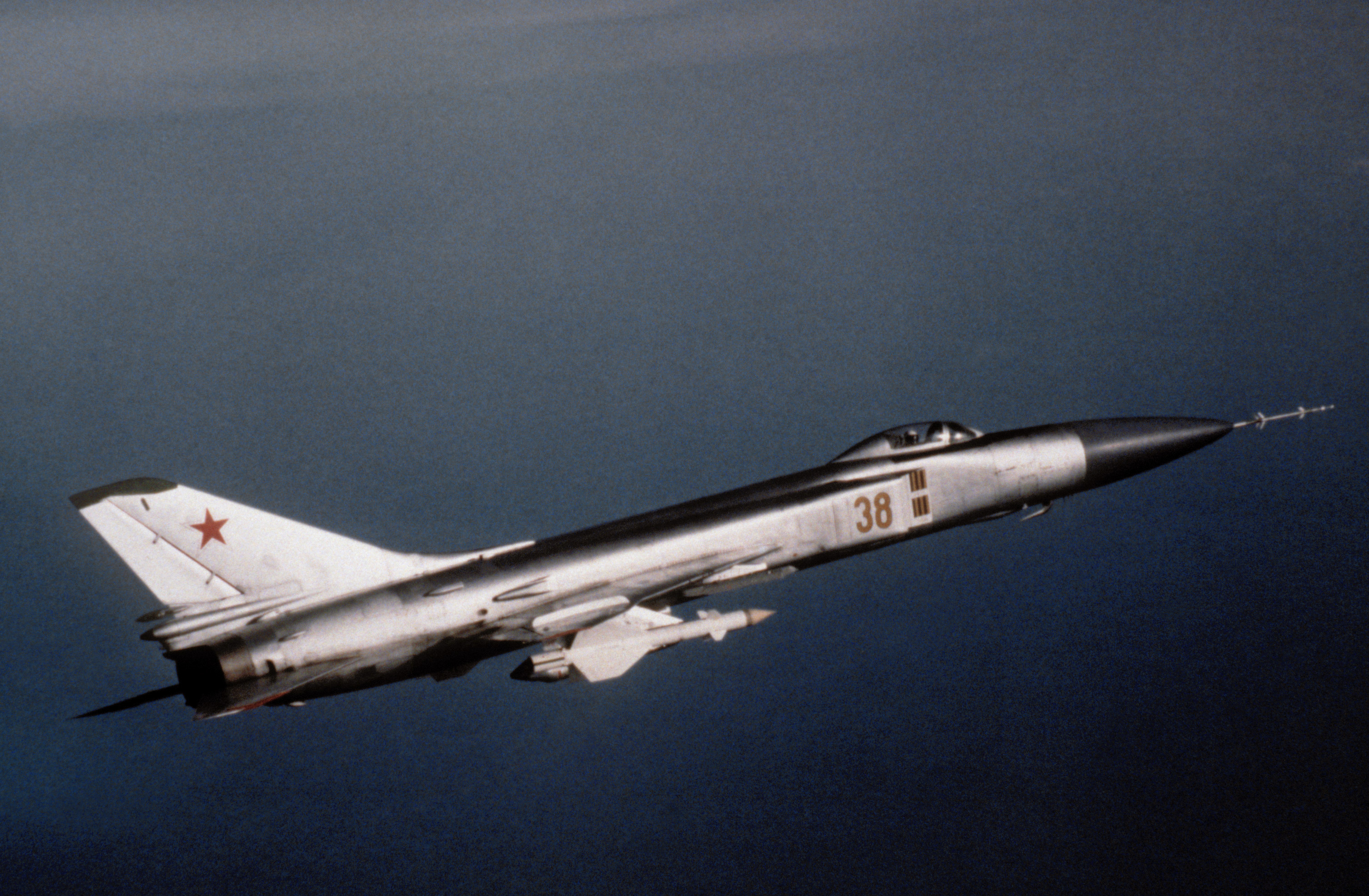
- An unidentified Su-15
- Type: Sukhoi Su-15
- Operator: Soviet Air Defense Forces
- Crew: 1
- Survivors: 1

The 1981 Armenia mid-air collision occurred on 18 July 1981 when a Soviet Air Defense Forces Sukhoi Su-15 crashed into the tail of a Transporte Aéreo Rioplatense Canadair CL-44 commercial transport which had strayed into Soviet airspace over the Armenian Soviet Socialist Republic. The three crew and one passenger on the Argentine aircraft died; the Soviet pilot was able to eject to safety.

== Background ==
Scotsman Stuart Allen McCafferty was hired to transport 360 tonnes (360,000 kg; 790,000 lb) of American-made tank spare parts and ammunition from Tel Aviv to Tehran, and had a Swiss partner, arms dealer Andreas Jenni. McCafferty allegedly approached numerous United States charter airlines, offering them US$175,000 (equivalent to $620,000 today) to operate 15 flights which would carry "pharmaceuticals" between Israel and Iran, but none of them were interested. In June 1981, McCafferty travelled to Buenos Aires, where he persuaded Transporte Aéreo Rioplatense to charter him one of their CL-44 cargo aircraft.

After completing the first two round-flights from Tel Aviv to Tehran, via Larnaca in Cyprus, the airliner was returning to Cyprus after having delivered the third tranche of cargo to Iran, when on 18 July 1981 the incident occurred. Before this incident, the Soviet Union had requested that Israel explain to it what was being transported on these cargo flights from Tel Aviv down the Turkish-Soviet border to Tehran. The Israel government ignored this request for information.

== Incident ==
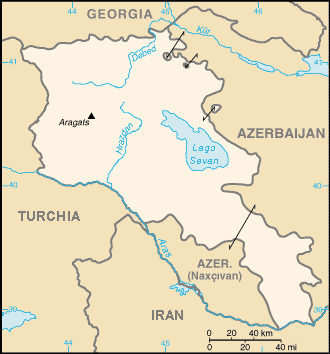
The incident occurred near the intersection of the borders of Armenia, Azerbaijan, Iran and Turkey. (Armenia, unlabelled, is the central area shown in light brown.)

On its return flight from Tehran, the aircraft strayed off course. After heading towards the Turkish border, it strayed into Soviet airspace in the Azerbaijan Soviet Socialist Republic, which led the Soviets to scramble an Air Defense Forces Sukhoi Su-15 (NATO reporting name "Flagon") to intercept the aircraft. According to Soviet reports, the crew failed to respond to radio calls and visual signals from the pilot of the fighter aircraft. The crew of the CL-44 attempted to get away from the area, and the Soviet pilot directed his aircraft into the tail of the escaping aircraft, causing both aircraft to crash near Yerevan in the Armenian Soviet Socialist Republic. The Soviet fighter pilot managed to eject to safety, but the four occupants of the CL-44 – three Argentine crew and McCafferty, who had chartered the aircraft – died. Jenni, the arms dealer who procured the arms that had been delivered by the aircraft to Tehran, disputed these events, claiming that the aircraft was shot down 125 miles (201 km) inside Turkish territory.

It is unclear whether the collision was intentional; the Soviet pilot said it was a deliberate attempt to down the enemy aircraft, while Western aviation experts examining his account believed he misjudged a turn and subsequently invented a story of self-sacrifice.
