= Transporte Aéreo Rioplatense =

Argentine cargo airline, 1971–1989

IATA	ICAO	Call sign
HR	HRT	RIOPLATENSE
- Founded: December 1969
- Commenced operations: March 1971
- Ceased operations: April 1989
- Hubs: Ministro Pistarini International Airport
- Fleet size: 5
- Destinations: 4
- Headquarters: Buenos Aires, Argentina
- Founder: Carlos F. Martinez Guerrero

Transporte Aéreo Rioplatense SACL was an Argentine cargo airline that operated in the 1970s and 1980s.

== History ==
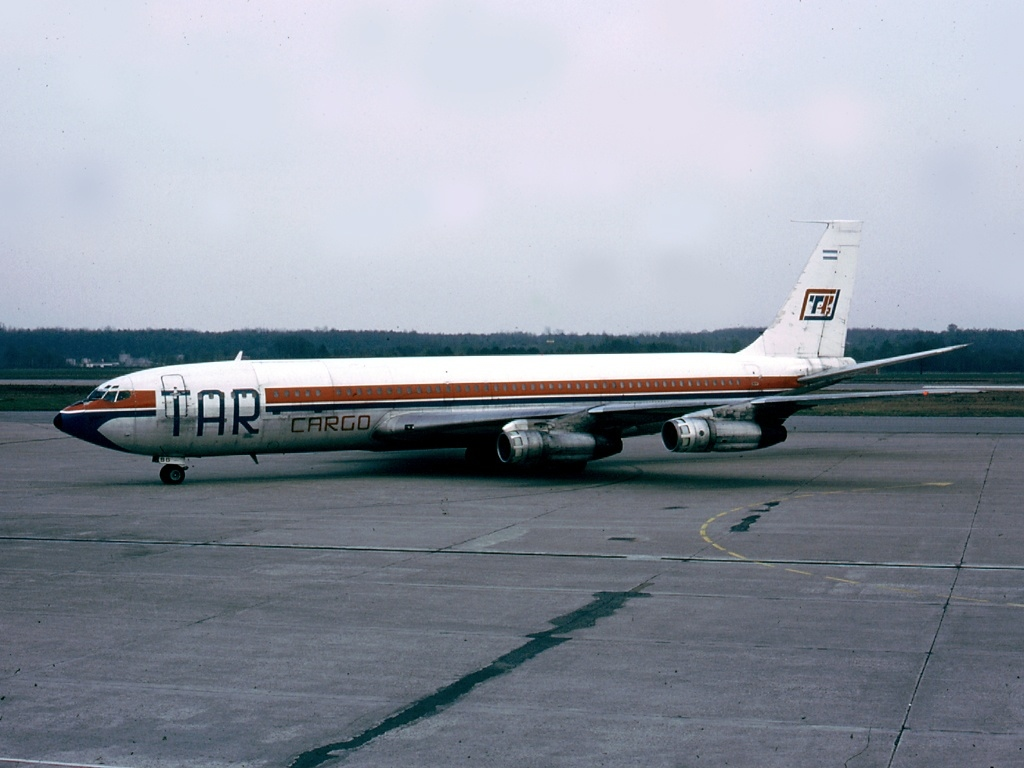
Boeing 707 of TAR at Malpensa Airport in 1981

The airline was set up in December 1969 by Carlos F. Martinez Guerrero and several of his associates. Operations commenced in July 1970, however, the first aircraft, a Canadair CL-44 freighter did not commence service with the airline until March 1971. Flights with the CL-44 commenced between Buenos Aires and Houston, on which cattle were transported, and the airline quickly established itself operating worldwide ad hoc charters, leading to the addition of three more of the aircraft type. The airline had regular flights to Houston, Miami, and Basel, Switzerland from September 1976.

The airline acquired its first Boeing 707 freighter from Dan-Air in 1978, and a second one a year later. The arrival of the 707s led to the gradual retirement from service of the CL-44s.

=== 1981 CL-44 crash ===
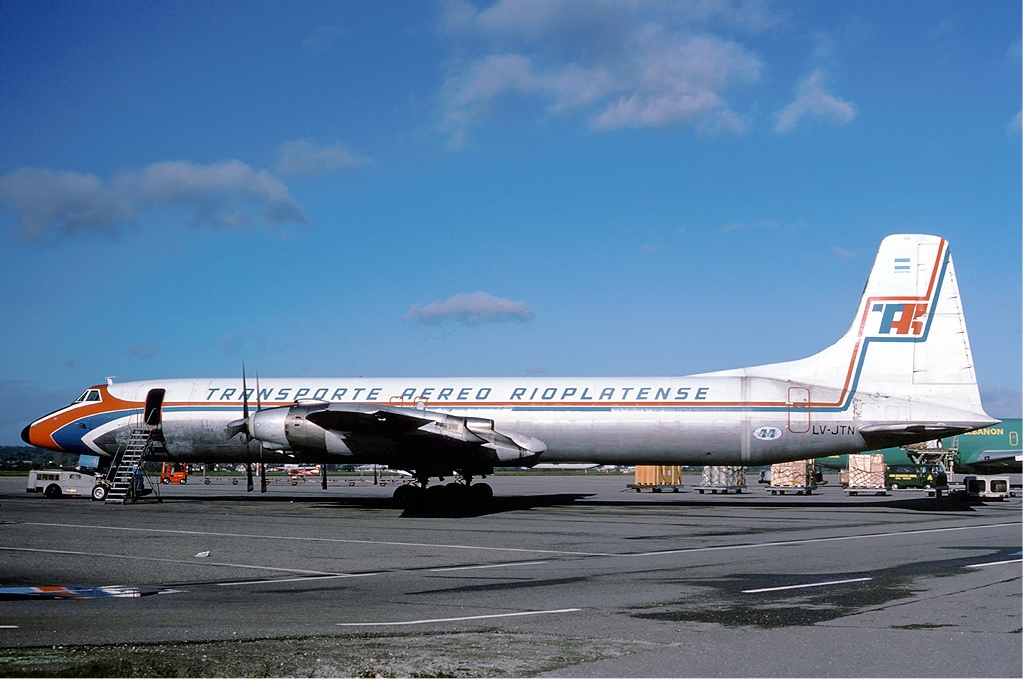
Canadair CL-44 of TAR at Basle Airport in 1976. The same aircraft was brought down by the Soviet Air Force in July 1981

In 1981, the airline was contracted to conduct a series of flights to send arms to Iran, to assist in arming Nicaraguan contras. Military equipment from Israel was shipped to Iran, in support of the latter during its war with Iraq. A total of 360 tons of arms were to be transported from Israel to Iran.

On 18 July 1981, one of the airline's CL-44s was returning to Cyprus after making the third delivery flight to Iran. It strayed into Soviet airspace in the Azerbaijan Soviet Socialist Republic and the Soviet Air Force sent a Sukhoi Su-15 to intercept it. The Su-15 hit the CL-44's tail and it crashed near the Soviet–Turkish border, killing all four of the occupants. The Soviet Union claimed that its Su-15 pilot deliberately downed the CL-44 by aerial ramming.

Transporte Aéreo Rioplatense continued to operate into the 1980s, but had ceased operations by 1989.

== Fleet ==
- 2 Boeing 707-320C (LV-MZE and LV-MSG)
- 1 Canadair CL-44-6 (LV-PRX; later LV-JZB)
- 2 Canadair CL-44-D4 (LV-PRM and LV-JZN)

== See also ==
- List of defunct airlines of Argentina
