= Perry H. Young Jr. =

Tuskegee Airmen instructor and commercial pilot (1919–1998)

Perry Young
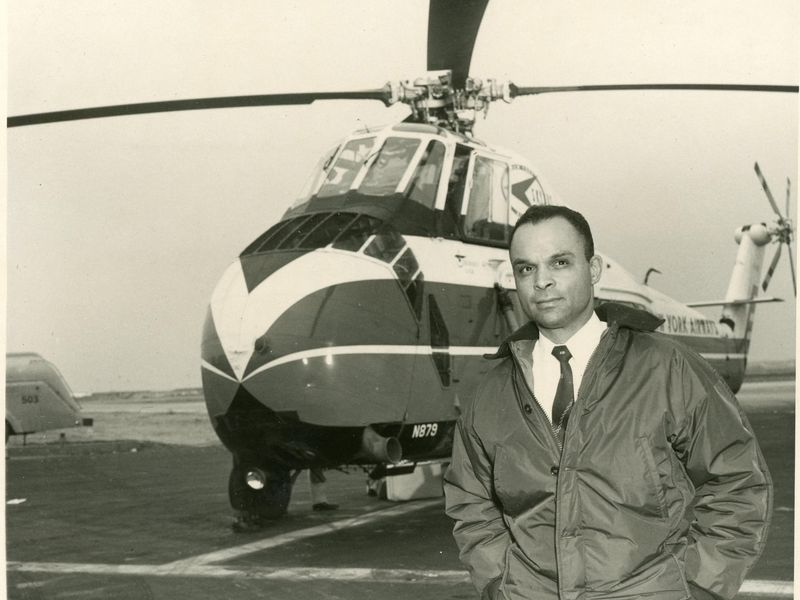
- Perry H. Young Jr. in front of a Sikorsky S-58
- Born: Perry Henry Young Jr. March 12, 1919; Orangeburg, South Carolina, United States
- Died: November 8, 1998 (aged 79); Middletown, New York, US
- Education: Oberlin College
- Spouse: Shakeh Young
- Aviation career
- Famous flights: First African-American pilot for a regularly scheduled commercial airline

Perry Henry Young Jr. (March 12, 1919 – November 8, 1998) was an American aviator who helped train pilots during World War II and became the first African American pilot for a regularly scheduled airline in the United States.

== Early life ==
Born in Orangeburg, South Carolina, in 1919, Young moved with his family to Ohio in 1929. After graduating from high school, he was accepted to Oberlin College. While a freshman at Oberlin, Young used the proceeds from part-time work to pursue a private pilot's license. He soloed in under four flight hours of instruction and earned his private pilot's license at 20 years old.

Young was so taken with flight, that he discontinued his college studies to attend the Coffey School of Aeronautics in Chicago, Illinois to earn his commercial pilot's license. Young attempted to find work as a commercial aviator for three subsequent years but, due to racial discrimination, he was unable to find work as a pilot.

== Tuskegee Airmen instructor ==
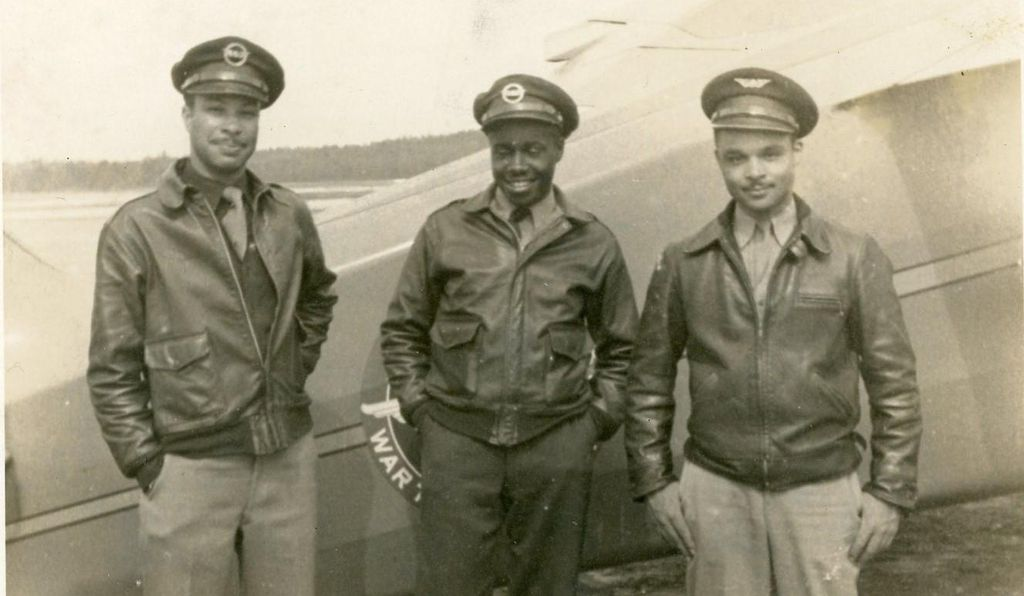
Perry H. Young Jr. (right) at Tuskegee

As America's entry into World War II approached, the US government enacted the Civilian Pilot Training Program in 1939 to fund pilot training at or near select colleges and universities. The program was expanded in 1941 and included some historically black colleges and universities. Most notably, this included Tuskegee University in Alabama where the famed Tuskegee Airmen were trained.

Young landed a job as one of the 40 African American flight instructors for the newly formed 99th Pursuit Squadron. He trained more than 150 Tuskegee Airmen pilots during his tenure. This included Lee Archer who was awestruck when he learned that some of the instructors in the program were Black:

"Very few of us knew anything about flying – few blacks did – and we thought our instructors were going to be white. When I saw men like Perry Young, I was surprised and proud. They were like minor gods to me."

Although he wanted to serve, Young was not allowed. The instructors were considered too valuable to potentially lose in combat and were forbidden to join deploying units. His wife was quoted as saying:

"He didn’t want to be an instructor who trained cadets. He wanted to be a cadet. He wanted to fly".

== International work ==
Even though Young was instrumental in training so many pilots for the war, he could not find employment as a pilot when the war ended. He briefly attended Howard University while working for the Public Building Administration's trucking service. But he soon began moving to wherever he could find aviation-related work. In 1946, he went to Haiti and established a small airline (Port-au-Prince Flying Service), but it soon closed. Young remained in Haiti, flying for the Société Haitienne-Américaine de Dévelopment Agricole until 1953. He worked for the Puerto Rico Water Resources Authority as executive pilot from 1953–1955. On Baffin Island, Canada, Young worked as an aviation mechanic for Seaboard World Airlines. He then moved to the Virgin Islands to take a pilot position with KLM, ferrying passengers to the Dutch Islands. By December 1956, Young had 13,000 flight hours (with 200 of those hours in helicopters).

== New York Airways ==
New York Airways (NYA) was a helicopter airline which started carrying passengers in 1953. When they upgraded their aircraft to Sikorsky S-58s, they needed to hire additional aircrew as the S-58 required a co-pilot. Young had been rejected previously from NYA for not meeting their helicopter flight time minimums (he had 200 hours, they required 500 hours). However, NYA management had now decided to 'break the color line' in aviation to bring good publicity to their fledgling helicopter ferry service. They contacted Young in the Virgin Islands and hired him on December 17, 1956.

After weeks of training with the company, Perry Young took his first official flight as a copilot on February 5, 1957. In doing so, he became the first African American pilot of a regularly scheduled commercial airline in the United States. The New York Mirror reported on the flight:

With Perry Young as the co-pilot, the 12-passenger helicopter rose three feet from the ground, hovered gently for a moment, then, pointing its snub-nose down, soared straight up from LaGuardia Airport. In nine easy “bumpless” minutes we were at Idlewild... Perry Young is unique because he is the first Negro pilot hired by any scheduled airline in America.

== Later career ==
Young would fly for NYA for 23 years (until the company went out of business in 1979). Afterwards, he flew sightseeing helicopter tours in the New York area until he retired. He died at the Horton Medical Center in Middletown, New York on November 8, 1998.
