= Canadair CL-44 =

Canadian turboprop airliner (1950s–60s)

CL-44 / CC-106 Yukon
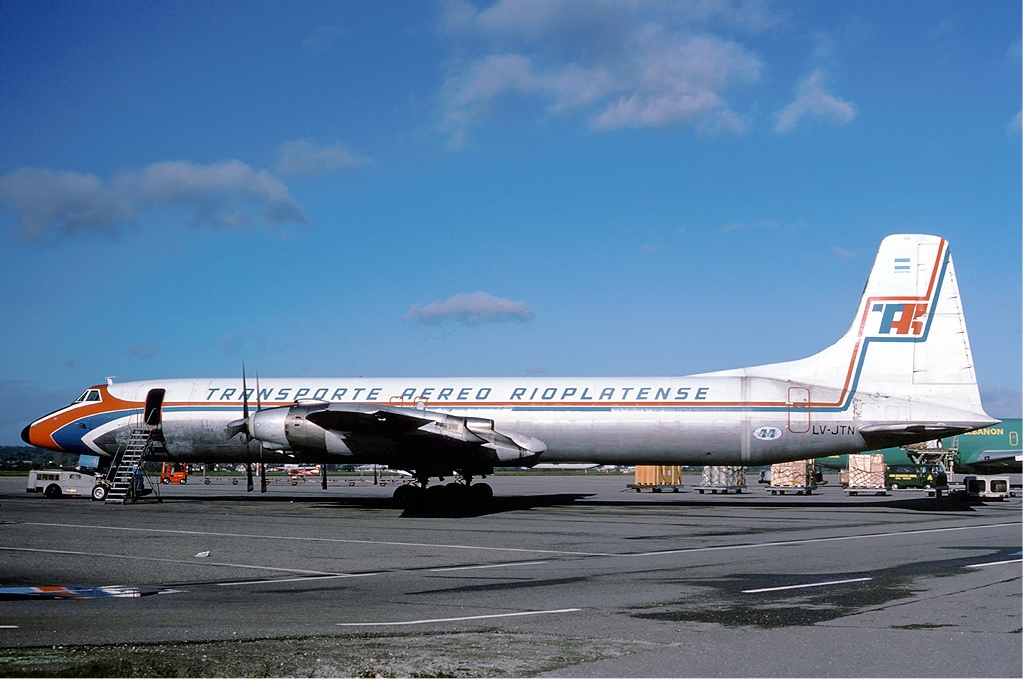
- A Canadair CL-44 of Transporte Aereo Rioplatense. The same aircraft crashed in July 1981 following a mid-air collision

General information
- Type: Military transport aircraft Cargo aircraft
- Manufacturer: Canadair
- Primary users: Royal Canadian Air Force Various airlines
- Number built: 39

History
- Introduction date: 19 July 1960 (RCAF)
- First flight: 16 November 1959
- Retired: 1971 (RCAF)
- Developed from: Bristol Britannia
- Developed into: Conroy Skymonster

The Canadair CL-44 was a Canadian turboprop airliner and cargo aircraft based on the Bristol Britannia that was developed and produced by Canadair in the late 1950s and early 1960s. Although innovative, only a small number of the aircraft were produced for the Royal Canadian Air Force (RCAF) (as the CC-106 Yukon), and for commercial operators worldwide.

The aircraft is named after the Canadian territory of Yukon.

== Design and development ==
In the 1950s, Canadair acquired a licence to build the Bristol Britannia airliner. Their first use of it was to build the heavily modified Canadair CL-28 Argus patrol aircraft (RCAF designation CP-107) that combined the Britannia's wings and tail sections with a new fuselage and engines. The resulting aircraft had lower speed and service ceiling, but it had two bomb bays and greatly extended loiter times.

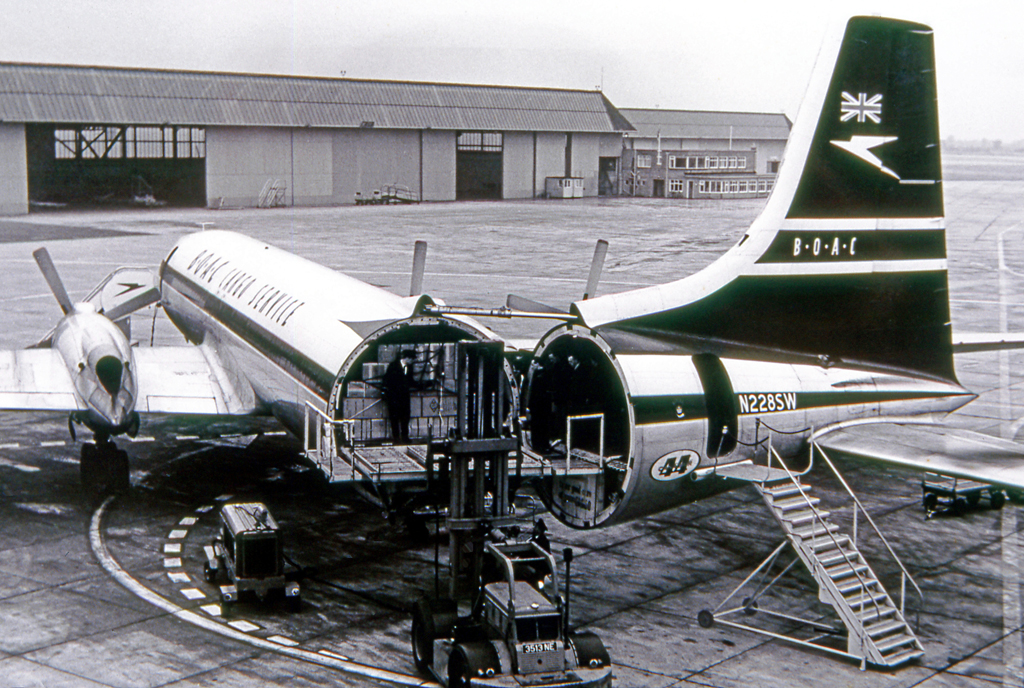
Loading a Canadair CL-44 at Manchester in 1963 with the fuselage swung open. This aircraft was operated by BOAC on charter from Seaboard World Airlines

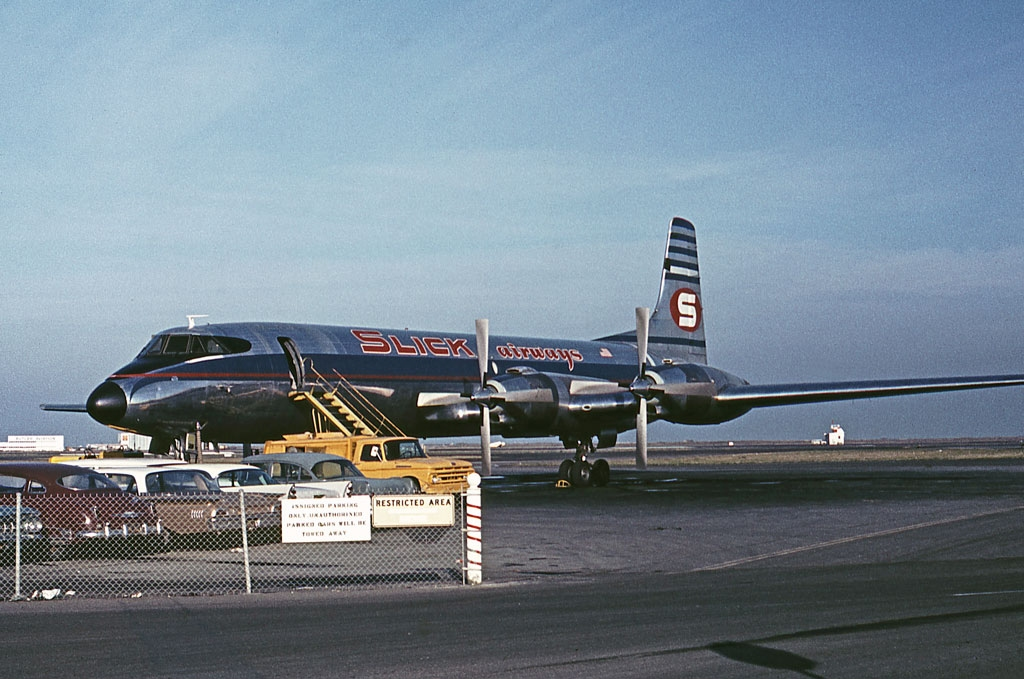
Slick Airways at San Francisco 1963

The RCAF required a replacement for its C-54GM North Star, itself an extensive redesign of the Douglas C-54 Skymaster. Among many changes, the proposed new aircraft was powered by Merlin engines. Canadair began work on a long range transport primarily intended to provide personnel and logistics support for Canadian Forces in Europe. In January 1957 Canadair received a contract for eight aircraft, later increased to 12. The RCAF designation for the new design was CC-106 Yukon, while the company's civilian variant was known as the CL-44-6. In company parlance the CL-44 was simply "the Forty-Four."

The RCAF specified the CL-44 to be equipped with Bristol Orion engines. When the British Ministry of Supply canceled the Orion program, the RCAF revised the specifications to substitute the Rolls-Royce Tyne 11. The CL-44 fuselage was lengthened, making it 12 ft 4 in (3.75 m) longer than the Britannia 300 with two large cargo doors added on the port side on some aircraft, while the cabin was pressurised to maintain a cabin altitude of 2,400 m at 9,000 m (30,000 ft). The design used modified CL-28 wings and controls. The Yukon could accommodate 134 passengers and a crew of nine. In the casualty evacuation role, it could take 80 patients and a crew of 11.

The rollout of the Yukon was a near-disaster because the prototype could not be pushed out of the hangar since the vertical fin could not clear the hangar doors. The first flight took place 15 November 1959 at Cartierville Airport. During test flights many problems were encountered, from complete electrical failure to engines shaking loose and almost falling off. Rolls-Royce had problems delivering engines, resulting in the sarcastically named "Yukon gliders" being parked outside Canadair as late as 1961.

== Operational history ==
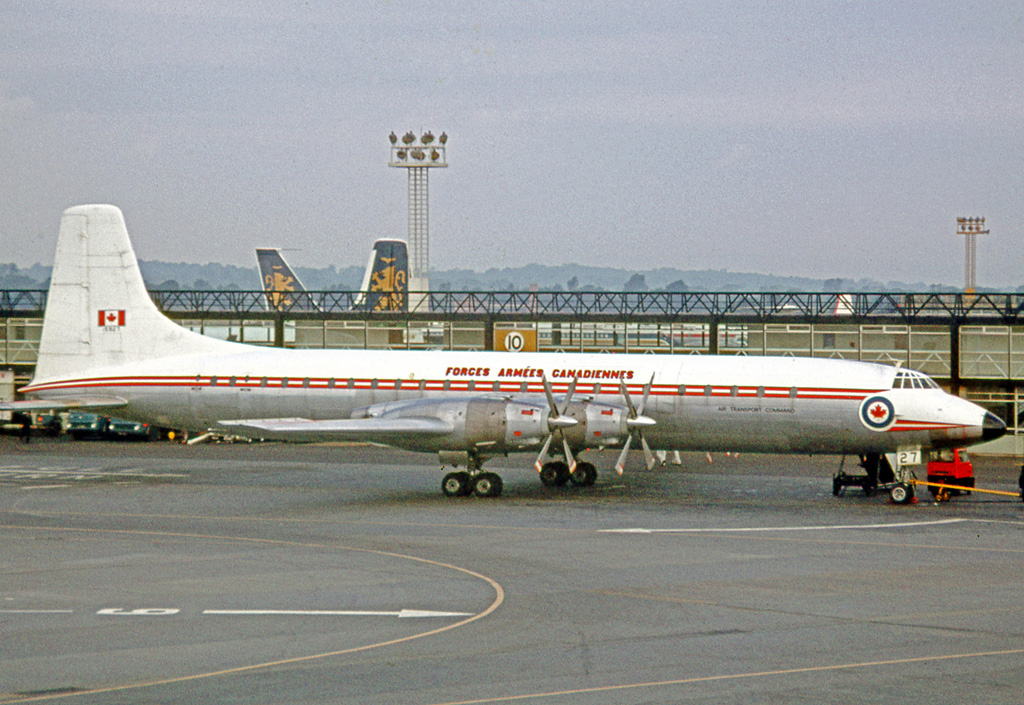
Canadair CC-106 Yukon of the Canadian Armed Forces at London Gatwick Airport in 1968

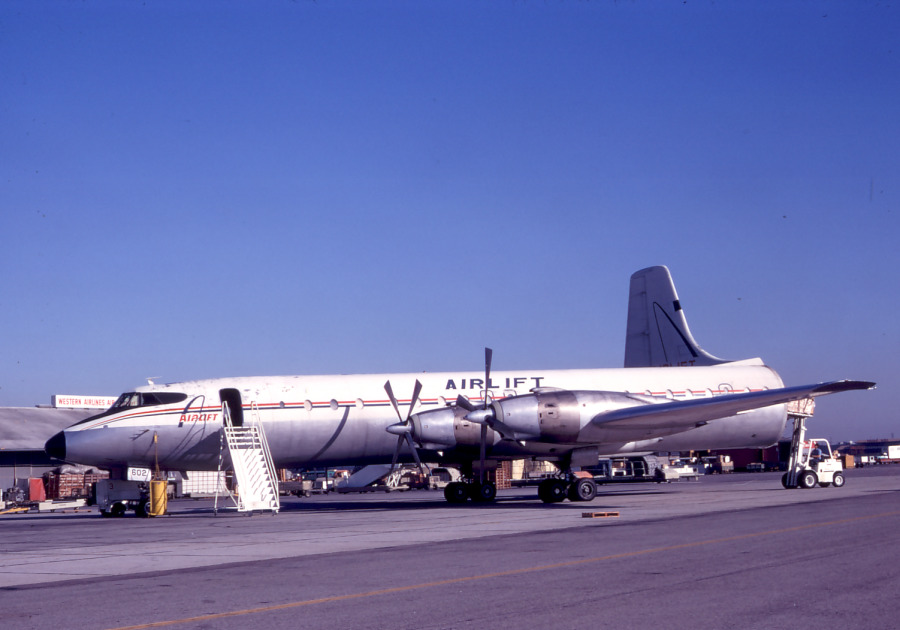
Airlift International LAX August 1969

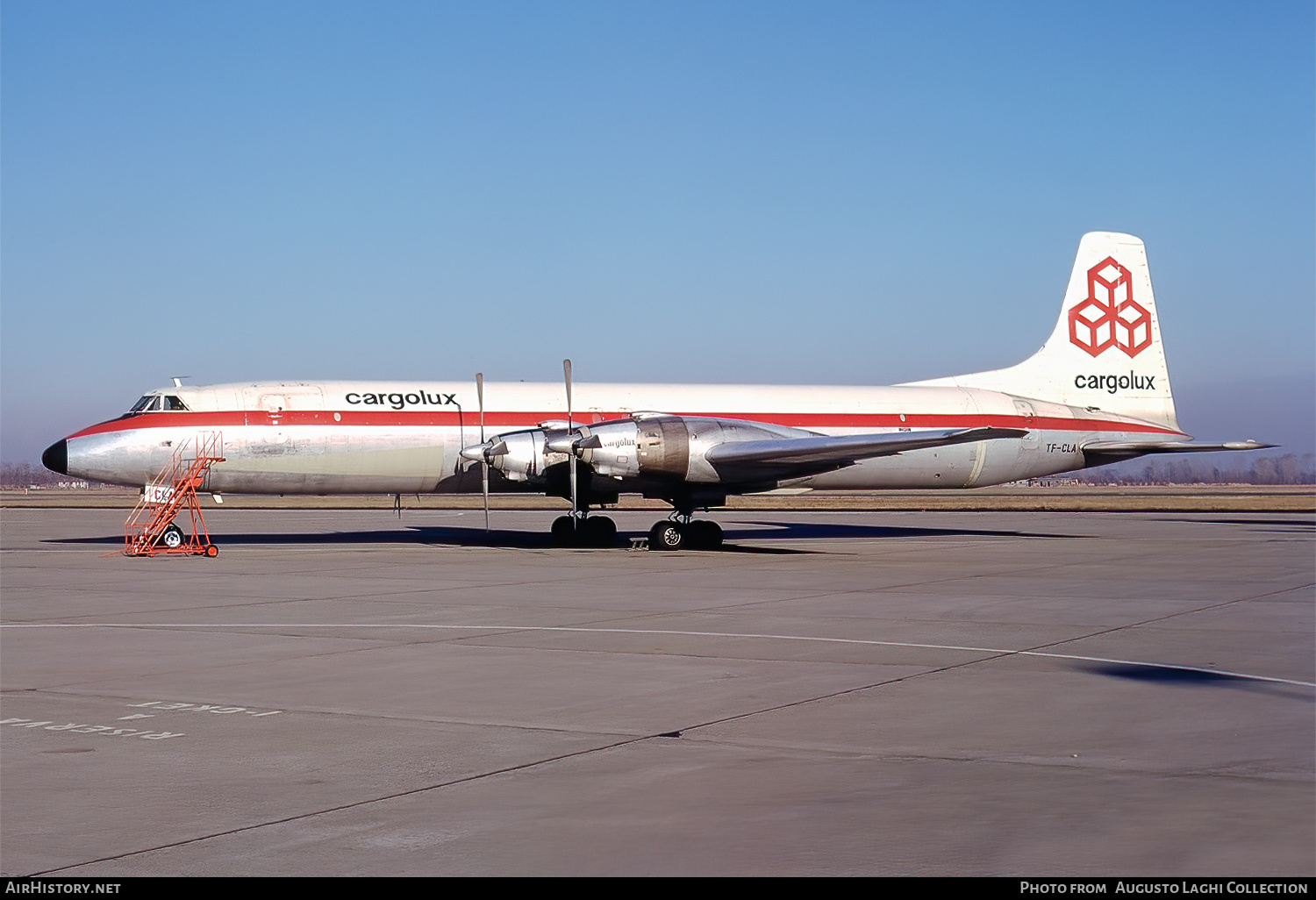
Cargolux Turin 1974

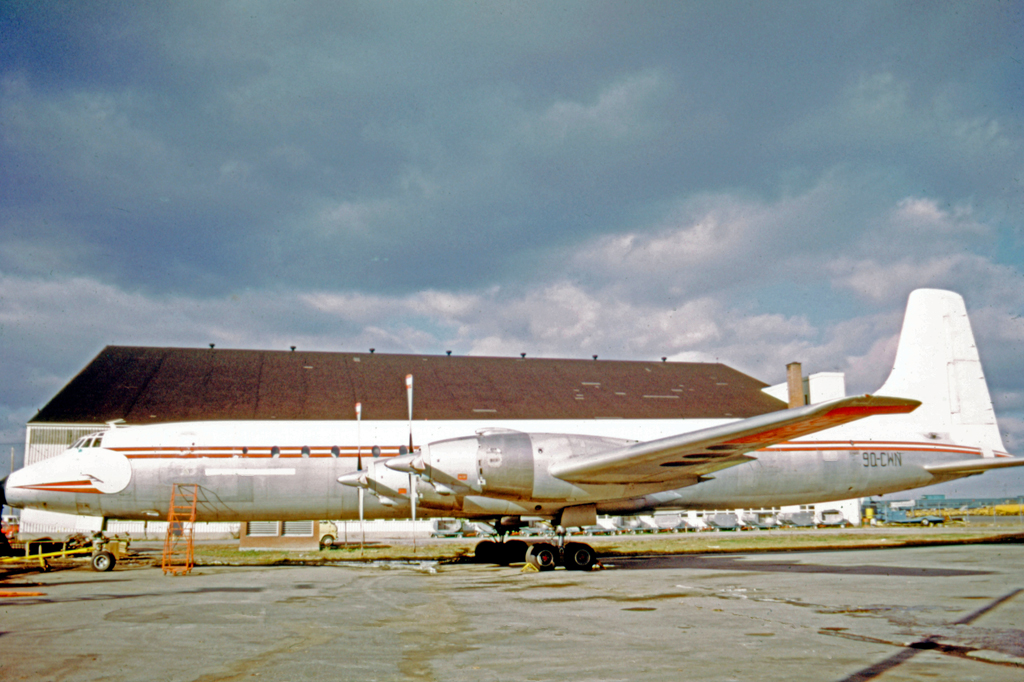
Canadair CC-106 of Societe Generale d'Alimentation (Zaire) at Montreal (Dorval) Airport in 1973 wearing remnants of its RCAF markings

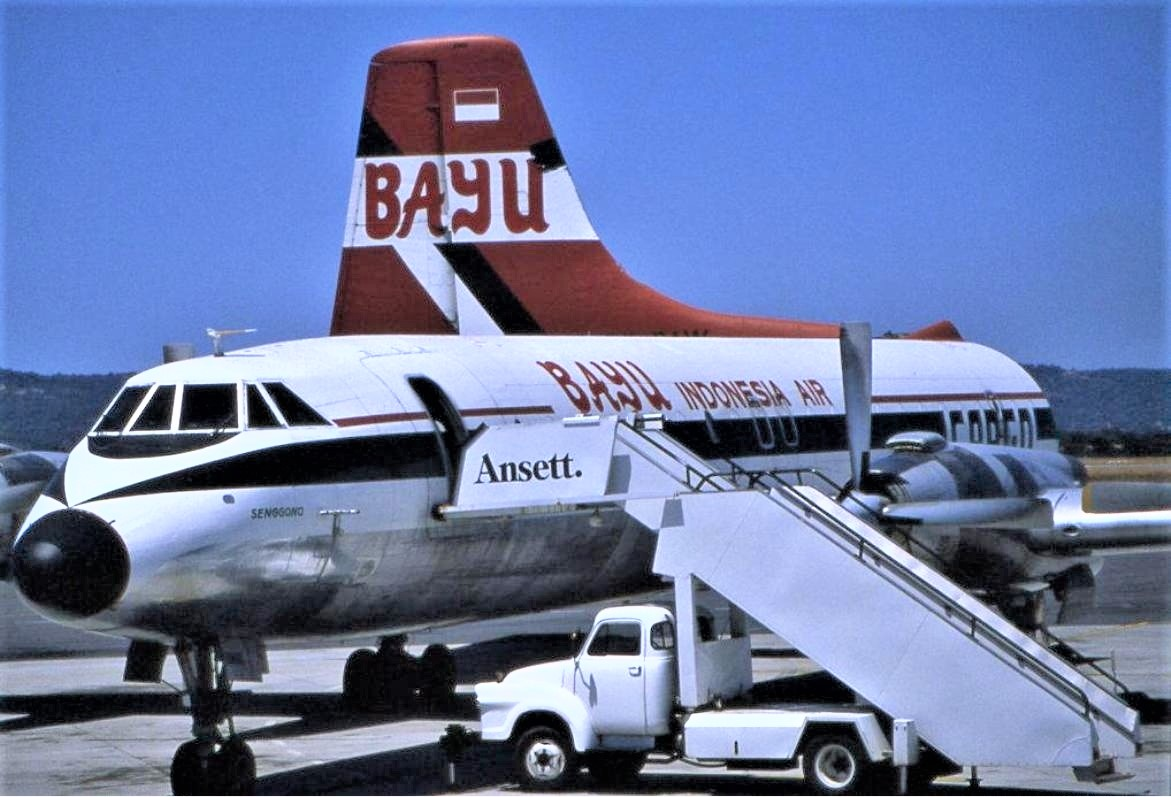
A CL-44D4-2 of Bayu Indonesia Air in the mid-1980s at Perth Airport

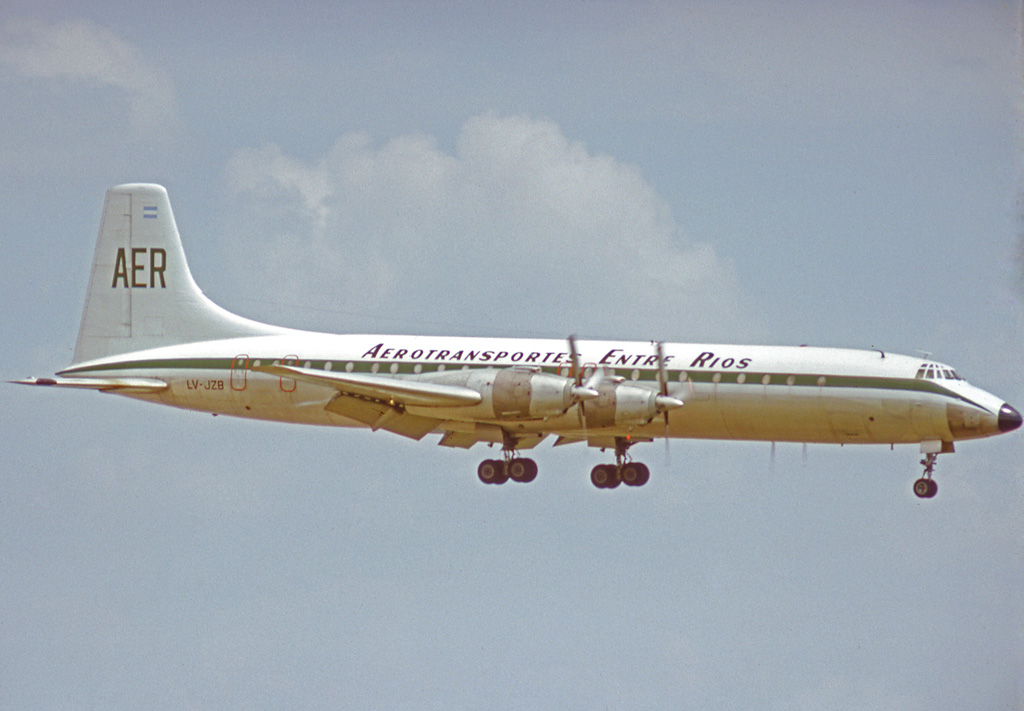
CC.106 of Aerotransportes landing at Miami in 1976

Initially, the CL-44-6 was produced for the RCAF as the CC-106 Yukon. Once initial problems were resolved, in RCAF service the Yukon performed well and in December 1961, a Yukon set a world record for its class when it flew 6,750 mi (10,860 km) from Tokyo to RCAF Station Trenton, Ontario, in 17 hours, three minutes at an average speed of 400 mph (640 km/h). Later, a Yukon set a new record staying airborne for 23 hours and 51 minutes. These records were unbroken until bettered by the Boeing 747SP in 1975. By the time of their retirement, Yukons had flown 65 million miles, 1.5 billion passenger miles and 360 million ton-miles.

The CL-44D4 was briefly considered for purchase by the United States Air Force in the 1960s but the project was never culminated due to political backlash in Canada and the United States. The USAF purchase of the CL-44 was complicated by two factors. It came in the aftermath of the cancellation of the Avro Canada CF-105 Arrow and involved a "swap deal" wherein 100 McDonnell F-101 Voodoo fighters were obtained in return for a contract for 232 CL-44-D4 transports for the Military Air Transport Service (MATS). The political controversy that resulted led to problems for a Quebec-based company receiving a contract so soon after an Ontario-based company had lost a major contract. The USAF also quickly found that buying a foreign aircraft was not easy when American companies wanted the business and they relinquished the contract to Canadair, awarding an order to Boeing for the KC-135 Stratotanker.

On the cargo aircraft variant CL-44D4 the entire tail section hinged. It could be opened using hydraulic actuators to load large items quickly. An inflatable seal at the hinge-break enabled cabin pressure to be maintained, and eight hydraulic-operated locks assured structural integrity. The tail could be opened from controls within the tail in 90 seconds. The flight controls at the joint were maintained by a system of push pads.

The CL-44D4 was the first large aircraft to be able to "swing" its tail, although some small naval aircraft had this feature to ease storage. These, however, required rigging before flight. There were only four original customers who bought and operated the CL-44D4.

Loftleiðir was the only passenger operator of the CL-44J, variant of CL-44D4 stretched on request by Canadair. It was the largest passenger aircraft flying over the Atlantic Ocean at that time. Loftleiðir marketed the CL-44J under the name "Rolls-Royce 400 PropJet". This led to the confusion that the CL-44J is sometimes referred to as the Canadair-400. Loftleiðir Icelandic Airlines merged with Air Iceland in 1973 and became today's Icelandair.

The CC-106 Yukons retired in March 1971 and were replaced by the CC-137 (Boeing 707). The Yukons might have served longer with the Canadian Forces Air Transport Command but for two factors: the need for an aircraft which could operate as an in-flight refueling tanker, and the chronic shortage and high cost of spares, the latter resulting because the CL-44 had never gone into large-scale production. All Yukons were sold to South American and African operators as they could not be registered in North America or Europe since the FAA refused to certify the original windshields which came from the Bristol Britannia because they did not meet flight crew vision standards. The General Dynamics CV880/990 windshields were compatible enough to be adopted into the flight deck structure, but the cost was prohibitive. The CC-106 had the original Bristol Britannia windshield and, on its retirement from RCAF operations, the cost of conversion was estimated at $250,000.00 per unit, cost alone precluding its use in North America and Europe. In 1974, a special exclusion was granted for the CC-106 (Cargo) for civil operations in Canada.

== Variants ==
=== CL-44-6 ===
Version built for the Royal Canadian Air Force as the CC-106 Yukon, 12 built.

=== CL-44D4-1 ===
Civil, commercial cargo aircraft, civil prototype and production aircraft for Seaboard World Airlines, eight built.

=== CL-44D4-2 ===
Civil, commercial cargo aircraft originally built for Flying Tiger Line, 13 built.

=== CL-44D4-6 ===
Civil, commercial cargo aircraft originally built for Slick Airways, four built.

=== CL-44D4-8 ===
Civil passenger aircraft for Loftleiðir Icelandic, two built.

=== CL-44J ===
Four CL-44D4 aircraft stretched by Canadair on request of Icelandic Airlines Loftleiðir, with a section, 10 ft 1 in (3.07 m) forward of the wing, and another section of 5 ft 1in (1.55 m) aft of the wing. This enabled the installation of 29 extra seats, bringing the capacity to 189 passengers. The maximum take-off weight stayed the same since the extra weight was compensated by removing the center wing tanks. Therefore, it can be said that the stretch was a trade of capacity for range.

=== CL-44-O ===
Also known as the Skymonster and CL-44 Guppy. The CL-44-O was a single CL-44D4-2 (c/n 16) converted by Conroy Aircraft, who removed the fuselage shell above the floorline, and rebuilt an enlarged fuselage to make it into a Guppy-type aircraft. It was intended to transport Rolls-Royce RB211 engine pods to the United States for Lockheed's L-1011 TriStar. The "O" stood for "outsized fuselage". In the end, the Lockheed L-100 Hercules was used instead.

== Operators ==
=== Civilian operators ===
Four original customers who bought and operated the CL-44D4 were: Seaboard World Airlines, The Flying Tiger Line, Slick Airways and the Icelandic Airlines Loftleiðir. All other operators operated second-hand aircraft.

♠ original operators

Argentina

- Transporte Aéreo Rioplatense
- Aerotransportes Entre Ríos

Australia

- HeavyLift Cargo Airlines was one of the operators of the CL-44 Guppy.

Belgium

- Young Cargo

Canada

- Beaver Enterprises (dealer purchased CC-106s from the RCAF)

Colombia

- Aerocondor Colombia (bought one CL-44-6 in 1974)
- AeroNorte Colombia (now Líneas Aéreas Suramericanas) (bought one CL-44J in 1984)
- Tampa Cargo
- SAEP Colombia

Cyprus

- Cyprus Airways (leased one CL-44D4-1 1978–1980)

Ecuador

- AECA Carga operated CL-44D-4-1
- Andes Airlines

El Salvador

- TACA International Airlines (one CL-44-6 leased in 1974)

Equatorial Guinea

- Skymaster Freight Services

Gabon

- SOACO

Indonesia

- Bayu Indonesian Air

Iceland

- Loftleiðir ♠

Ireland

- Aer Turas

Lebanon

- Trans Mediterranean Airways (leased)

Libya

- United African Airlines later became Jamahiriya Air Transport

Luxembourg

- Cargolux

Morocco

- Royal Air Maroc (one aircraft leased in 1980)

Peru

- Aeronaves de Peru

Spain

- Cargosur

Switzerland

- Transvalair operated two aircraft.

United Kingdom

- BOAC operated a transatlantic cargo service (London-Manchester-New York) with an aircraft leased from Seaboard World Airlines from 1963 until 1965.
- British Cargo Airlines
- British Air Ferries
- Redcoat Air Cargo
- Transmeridian Air Cargo operated total eight CL-44 including Guppy aircraft.

United States

- Aeron International Airlines
- Air Express International
- Airlift International
- Cargosur
- The Flying Tiger Line ♠
- Seaboard World Airlines ♠
- Slick Airways ♠
- Tradewinds Airlines
- Wrangler Aviation

Uruguay

- Aero Uruguay
- Atlantida Linea Aérea Sudamericana (ALAS)

Zaire

- Societé Générale d'Alimentation (SGA) (three CL-44-6s from 1973)
- Tramaco

=== Military operators ===
Canada

- Royal Canadian Air Force ♠
  - No. 412 Squadron RCAF used two aircraft as VIP transports.
  - No. 426 Squadron RCAF
  - No. 436 Squadron RCAF
  - No. 437 Squadron RCAF received 11 Yukons with two as aerial tankers.
  - No. 4 (Transport) Operational Training Unit RCAF
- Canadian Forces

== Accidents and incidents ==
The Canadair CL-44 suffered 21 hull loss incidents during its operational history including the following:

- 21 March 1966: N453T, Flying Tiger Line, crashed upon landing at NAS Norfolk, Virginia due to crew inexperience.
- 24 December 1966: While trying to land in heavy fog on Da Nang International Airport, a Flying Tiger Line CL-44 crashed into the village of Binh Thai, killing all four crew on board and 107 people on the ground.
- 2 December 1970: TF-LLG Cargolux Airlines S.A. crashed on approach to Dacca when controls lock system engaged.
- 20 July 1972: LV-JYR, Aerotransportes Entre Rios – AER disappeared on a cargo flight from Carrasco International Airport, Montevideo, Uruguay to Santiago, Chile, with the loss of five crew members.
- 22 December 1974: G-AWSC, Tradewinds Airways, written off following damage in hard landing at Lusaka, Zambia
- 2 September 1977: G-ATZH crashed into sea while attempting emergency landing after an engine fire spread to the wing after takeoff from Hong Kong Kai Tak airport, all four crew were killed.
- 6 July 1978: G-BCWJ, Tradewinds Airways, written off after damage caused when main gear retracted after hard landing in Nairobi, Kenya.
- 4 November 1980: 5B-DAN, Cyprus Airways, damaged beyond repair in after an emergency landing at RAF Akrotiri, Cyprus.
- 18 July 1981: A Soviet Air Defense Forces Sukhoi Su-15 interceptor collided with a Transporte Aéreo Rioplatense Canadair CL-44 that had mistakenly entered Soviet Airspace. All four occupants on board the airliner were killed whilst the Soviet Su-15 pilot ejected and survived; the aircraft was delivering arms from Israel to Iran.
- 6 April 1986: HK-3148X of Lineas Aereas Suramericanas, Colombia crashed upon approach to Barranquilla, Colombia
- 14 April 2000: 3C-ZPO was damaged beyond economic repair when ammunition caught fire while on ground in Kinshasa

== Specifications CL-44D4 ==
Data from http://en.avia.pro/blog/canadair-cl-44-tehnicheskie-harakteristiki-foto

General characteristics

- Crew: 2 pilots, 1 flight engineer plus loadmasters as required.
- Capacity: 160 passengers and 66,048 lb (29,959 kg) useful load
- Length: 136 ft 11 in (41.73 m)
- Wingspan: 142 ft 4 in (43.37 m)
- Height: 36 ft 8 in (11.18 m)
- Wing area: 2,075 sq ft (192.7 m^{2})
- Empty weight: 88,952 lb (40,348 kg)
- Max takeoff weight: 210,000 lb (95,000 kg)
- Powerplant: 4 × Rolls-Royce Tyne 515/50 turboprops, 5,730 shp (4,270 kW) each
- Propellers: 4-bladed variable pitch propellers

Performance

- Maximum speed: 420 mph (670 km/h, 360 kn)
- Cruise speed: 401 mph (646 km/h, 349 kn)
- Range: 5,588 mi (8,993 km, 4,856 nmi)
- Service ceiling: 30,000 ft (9,100 m)

== See also ==
Related development

- Bristol Britannia
- Canadair CP-107 Argus
- Conroy Skymonster

Related lists

- List of aircraft of Canada's air forces
