= Seaboard World Airlines Flight 253A =

1968 aviation incident

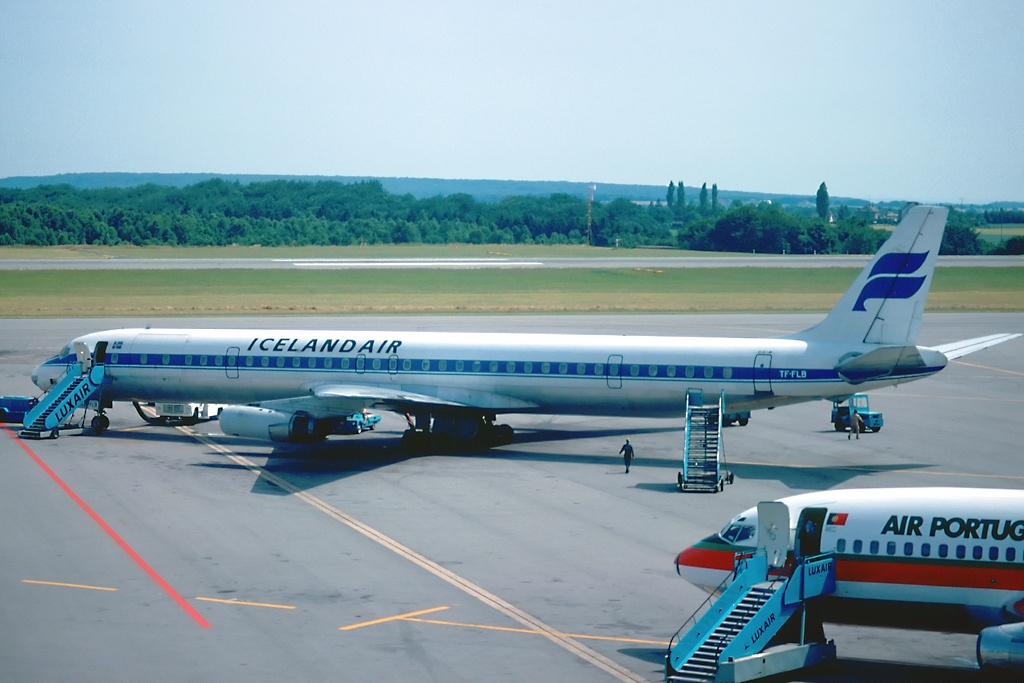
- The aircraft involved in 1983, while operating with Icelandic Airlines

Incident
- Date: July 1, 1968
- Summary: Forced landing
- Site: Kuril Islands, Soviet Union

Aircraft
- Aircraft type: Douglas DC-8 Super 63CF
- Operator: Seaboard World Airlines (chartered as a troop transport)
- Registration: N8631
- Flight origin: McChord Air Force Base, Washington
- Destination: Yokota Air Base, Japan
- Occupants: 238
- Passengers: 214
- Crew: 24
- Fatalities: 0
- Injuries: 0
- Survivors: 238

Seaboard World Airlines Flight 253A was a military charter flight carrying 214 American troops bound for South Vietnam. On July 1, 1968, the plane was intercepted by Soviet jets after it unintentionally violated Soviet airspace. It was forced to land on one of the Soviet-controlled Kuril Islands with all 238 Americans aboard being detained for two days.

== Background ==
On the afternoon of July 1, 1968, a Seaboard World Airlines Douglas DC-8 Super 63CF departed McChord Air Force Base, near Seattle, Washington bound for Yokota Air Base in Japan. The plane was piloted by Joseph D. Tosolini, with copilot Henry Treger, flight engineer Earl Scott, and navigator Lawrence Guernon. Because the plane was on its maiden flight, the crew also included a check pilot and a check engineer. It was carrying 214 American troops and 24 crew members who were en route to South Vietnam via Japan.

The aircraft strayed westward of its planned track as it came into range of Japan, passing along the Soviet-controlled Kuril Islands. Japanese radar controllers notified the crew of the error when it was about 80 nautical miles (150 km) off course. Accounts differ as to whether the message was unintelligible to Flight 253A due to static or whether the message was received but the crew did not have time to react. Two Soviet MIG fighter aircraft, piloted by Yu. B. Alexandrov, V.A. Igonin, I.F. Evtoshenko and I.K. Moroz, intercepted the DC-8 at 2320 UTC (8:20 am), and directed it to follow by firing warning shots. The DC-8 was led to Burevestnik airfield on the Soviet-controlled Iturup Island, landing at 2339 UTC (8:39 am), on the 2,400 metres (7,900 ft) concrete runway. No damage to the plane was reported by the captain as he shut down the engines at 8:42 am.

Burevestnik was a Soviet interceptor airfield served only by a military post and a small village. Initially all the Americans were confined to the aircraft and allowed outside to a radius of about 100 metres (330 ft) of the plane. Food in the galley ran out the next day, and the Soviets delivered military rations of brown bread, canned cheese, butter, weak coffee, beef bouillon, noodles, and cigarettes. The female cabin flight crew were allowed to sleep in a maintenance building on the second night.

== Negotiations ==
Diplomatic negotiations between the United States and Moscow began almost immediately with U.S. Ambassador Llewellyn Thompson already in Moscow for nuclear arms reduction talks. The Nuclear Non-Proliferation Treaty, which had been negotiated just weeks earlier, had been signed by U.S. President Lyndon Johnson on that day. Ambassador Thompson informed Soviet Premier Alexei Kosygin that the airspace violation was unintentional, but Kosygin explained that circumstances prevented him from doing as he wished and that the incident was under investigation.

The following day Thompson was given a short protest note by the Soviets. A partially declassified CIA document indicated that Deputy Minister Kuznetsov added the personal comment that the USSR "did not wish to do anything to worsen our relations" but expressed it was most important to have a quick reply. The U.S. issued a short note of apology, and Tosolini also apologized, allowing the plane to leave. Upon landing at Misawa Air Base in northern Japan about an hour later, Tosolini retracted his apology, insisting the plane had not strayed into Soviet territory.

== Aftermath ==
The incident was a diplomatic embarrassment for all parties, playing into the hands of the Soviet Union by distracting the U.S. from arms talks. The Sino-Soviet split reached a peak at this time, with China viewing the USSR's release of the plane as aiding Americans in the fight against North Vietnam, one of China's allies.

In December 1968, Seaboard was forced to pay a $5,000 civil penalty to the FAA, as its onboard Doppler radar was not properly certified.

== See also ==
- Hainan Island incident
- Korean Air Lines Flight 902
- Korean Air Lines Flight 007
