= Transmeridian Air Cargo =

British cargo airline

TAC-Transmeridian Air Cargo
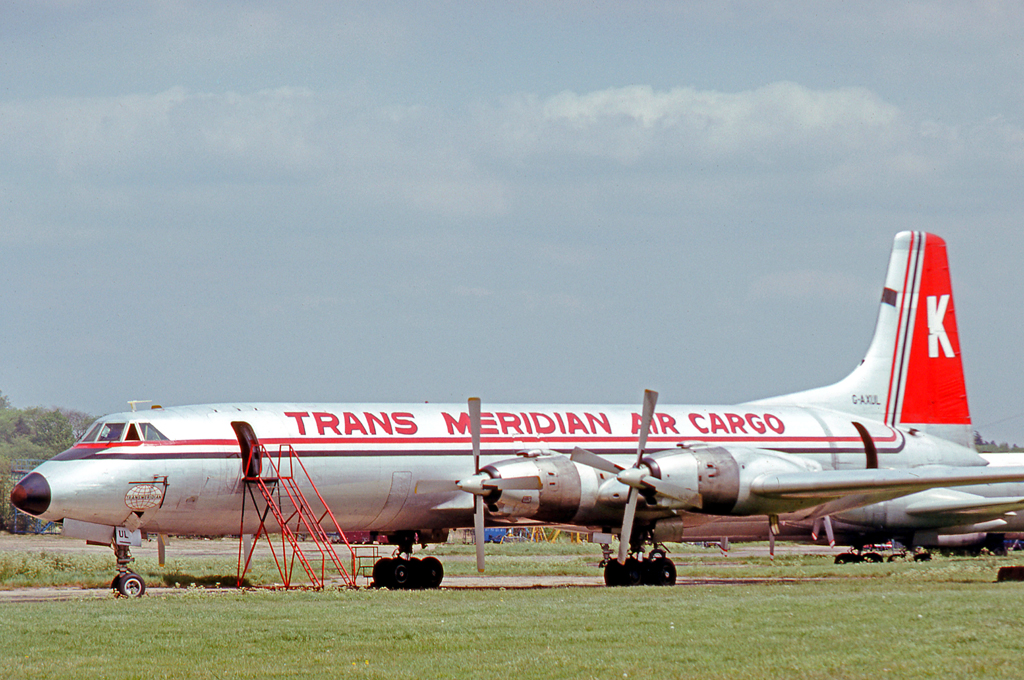
- Canadair CL-44
IATA	ICAO	Call sign
KK	-	TRANSMERIDIAN
- Founded: 1962
- Commenced operations: 1962
- Ceased operations: 1979
- Headquarters: Liverpool, England (1962–1968); London, England (1968–1979)

Transmeridian Air Cargo (IATA: KK, ICAO: ·, call sign: Transmeridian) (TAC) was a British cargo airline that operated from 1962 until 1979 when it merged with IAS Cargo Airlines to form British Cargo Airlines.

== History ==
The airline was founded as Trans Meridian Flying Services Ltd. on 5 October 1962 by a group of pilots. The capital was subscribed also by T. D. Keegan (a B.K.S. Air transport founder) via his Keegan Aviation. The air carrier began operations on 15 December using a Douglas DC-4. The airline was then based at Liverpool and used the DC-4 for freight and passenger charters. A second DC-4 (both were ex-military Douglas C-54 Skymaster) was bought and freight services to Dublin and Paris–Le Bourget Airport were begun.

At the beginning of 1965 the DC-4s were replaced by Douglas DC-7C and a year later two more DC-7s were acquired. With the expansion of the fleet freight services to the Middle East and Africa were started. By the end of 1967 the company was taken over by Trans World Leasing and converted into a pure freight operation, and the name was changed to Trans Meridian (London) Ltd. in early 1968.

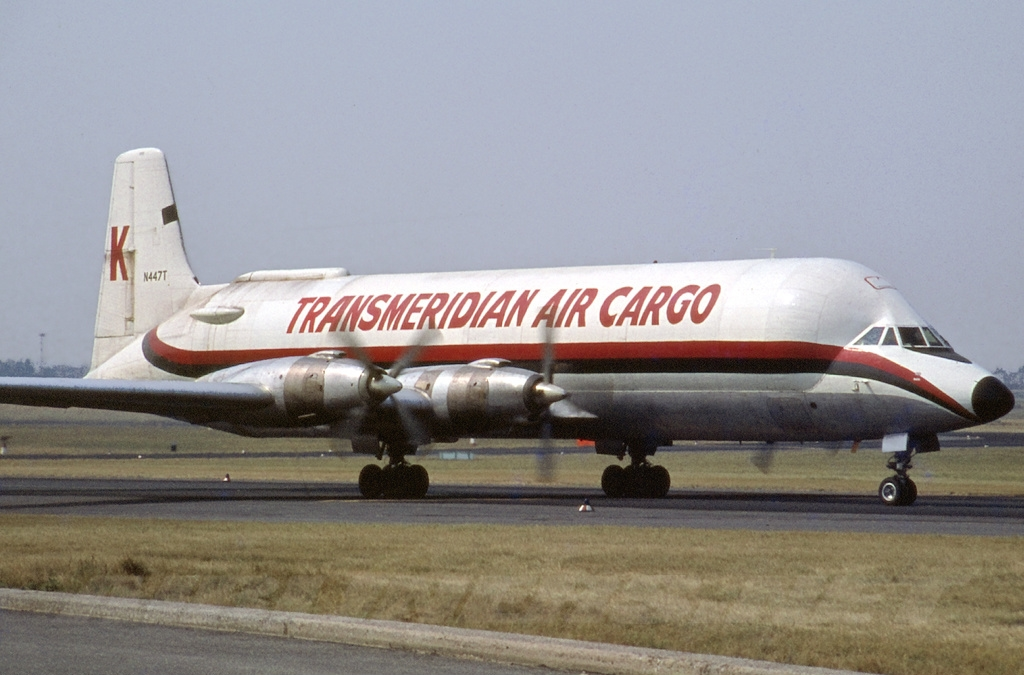
Conroy-converted Canadair CL-44 "Guppy"

In 1968 the Canadair CL-44 was introduced and eventually eight examples were incorporated the fleet, all being fitted with rotating rear fuselages to facilitate the loading of large/long shipments of cargo. It was during this period that the base of operations was moved to London Stansted Airport. Operations continued throughout the 1970s with 1975 being the year when a base was set up in Hong Kong for freight flights to Australia. In the meanwhile - in 1970 - the registered name had changed to Trans Meridian Air Cargo Ltd. (TAC).

In 1977 the Trafalgar House Group bought 90% of the air carrier and on 20 August 1979 merged it with IAS Cargo Airlines to form British Cargo Airlines..

== Subsidiary airlines abroad ==
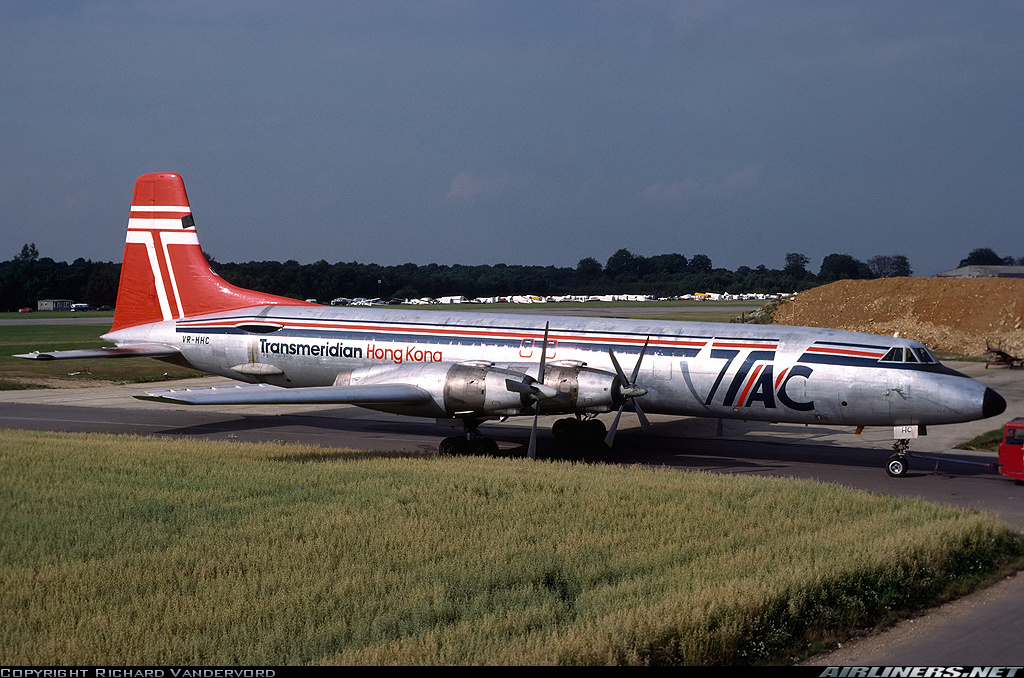
Transmeridian (Hong Kong) Canadair CL-44D4-2, locally registered VR-HHC

By the end of the 1972 season two CL-44s could be found plying the ‘Genghis Khan Route’ to Hong Kong via Cyprus, Turkey, the Middle East, India, and points in SE Asia, together with the ‘Impala Route’ to Kano and Lagos. In order to facilitate the scope of its operations, TAC began establishing overseas associates in whose liveries the CL-44s appeared from time to time:

- Express Flug in Germany in 1973
- Transvalair in Switzerland in 1974
- Transmeridian (Hong Kong) in 1975
- Limburg Air Cargo in Netherlands in 1975
- Tropical Airlines in 1979

== Accidents and incidents ==
- On 2 September 1977 - A CL-44D4 Flight 3751 crashed shortly after takeoff from Kai Tak Airport in Hong Kong. All four crew members were killed. The cause was a loss of control after the right wing and number 4 engine had experienced structural failure, resulting in an in-flight fire.

== See also ==
- List of defunct airlines of the United Kingdom
