= Seaboard World Airlines =

Cargo airline of the United States (1946–1980)

IATA	ICAO	Call sign
SB^{(1)}	SB^{(1)}	SEABOARD
- Founded: September 16, 1946 (as Seaboard & Western Airlines)
- Commenced operations: May 10, 1947 (as Seaboard & Western Airlines); April 26, 1961 (as Seaboard World Airlines)
- Ceased operations: April 26, 1961 (as Seaboard & Western Airlines); October 1, 1980 (merged into Flying Tiger Line)
- Hubs: John F. Kennedy International Airport
- Fleet size: 81 (Historically)
- Headquarters: New York City, New York, United States
- Founders: Arthur Norden; Raymond Norden

Notes
- (1) IATA, ICAO codes were the same until the 1980s

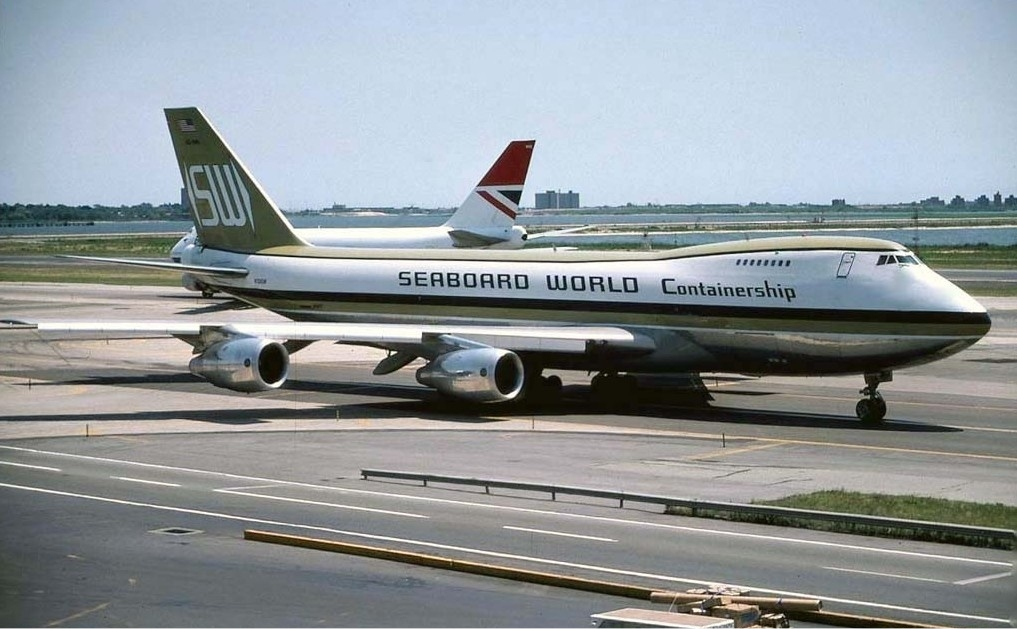
A Boeing 747-200F at the New York John F. Kennedy Airport in 1977.

Seaboard World Airlines was an international all-cargo airline based in the United States. Originally an irregular air carrier, the airline was certificated as the first US transatlantic scheduled cargo airline in 1955 by the Civil Aeronautics Board (CAB), the now defunct federal agency that, from 1938 to 1978, tightly regulated almost all US commercial air transportation. Seaboard's headquarters were on the grounds of John F. Kennedy International Airport in New York City.

== History ==
Seaboard World Airlines was founded on September 16, 1946, as Seaboard & Western Airlines. It initially operated Douglas DC-4 aircraft, followed by Lockheed Super Constellation airliners. In 1955, it received final approval on CAB certification to fly scheduled cargo services across the Atlantic.

It adopted the name Seaboard World Airlines in April 1961. Jet cargo service started in 1964 with the introduction of the Douglas DC-8.

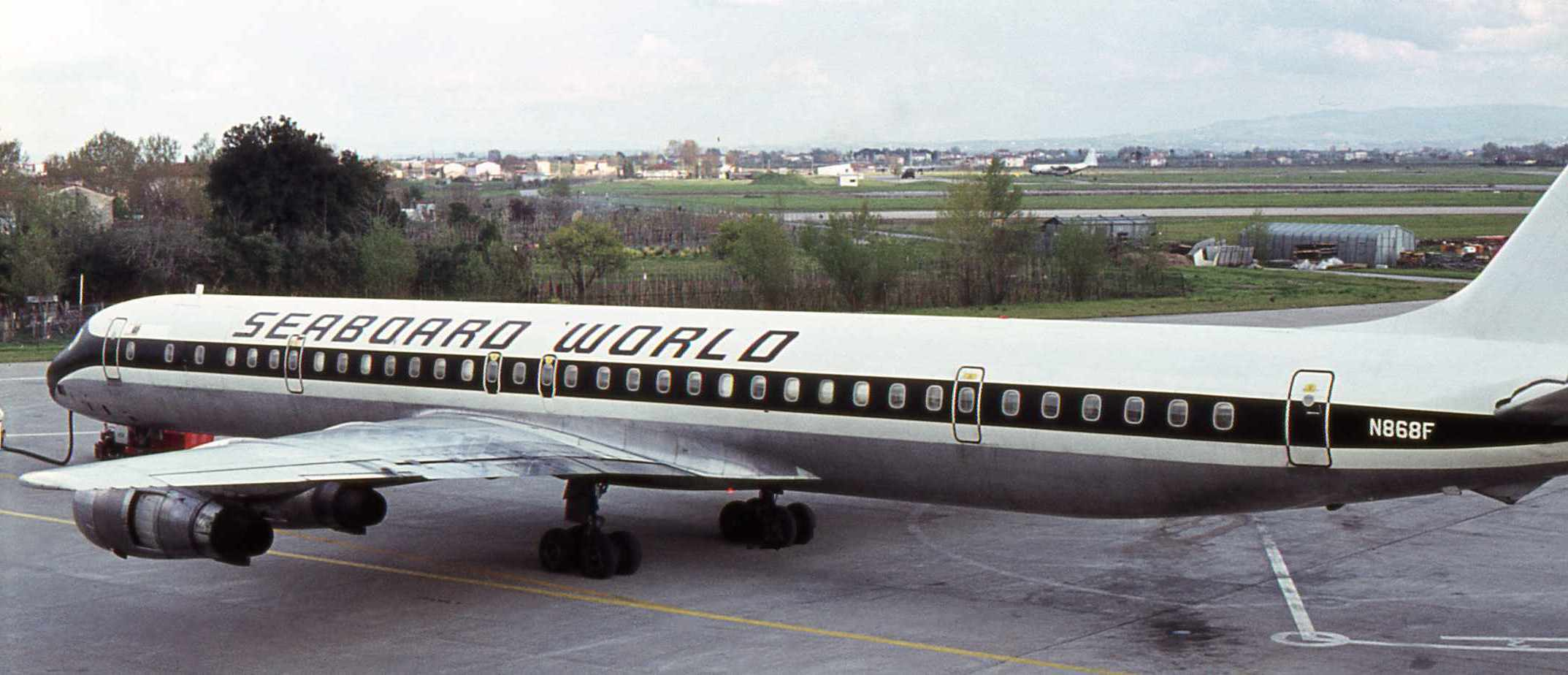
A DC-8 in Pisa (1974).

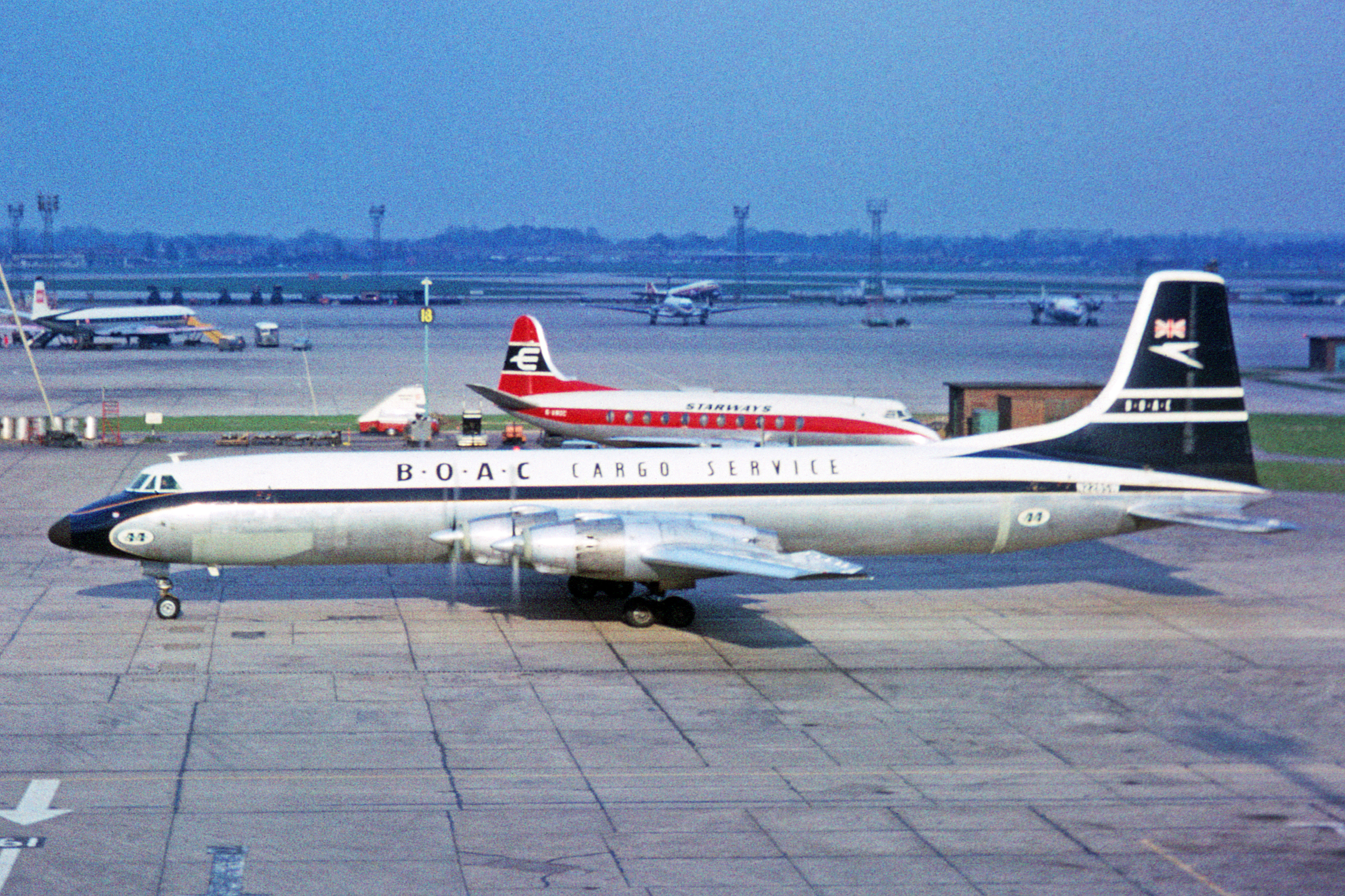
Seaboard CL-44 operating on behalf of BOAC, London 1964

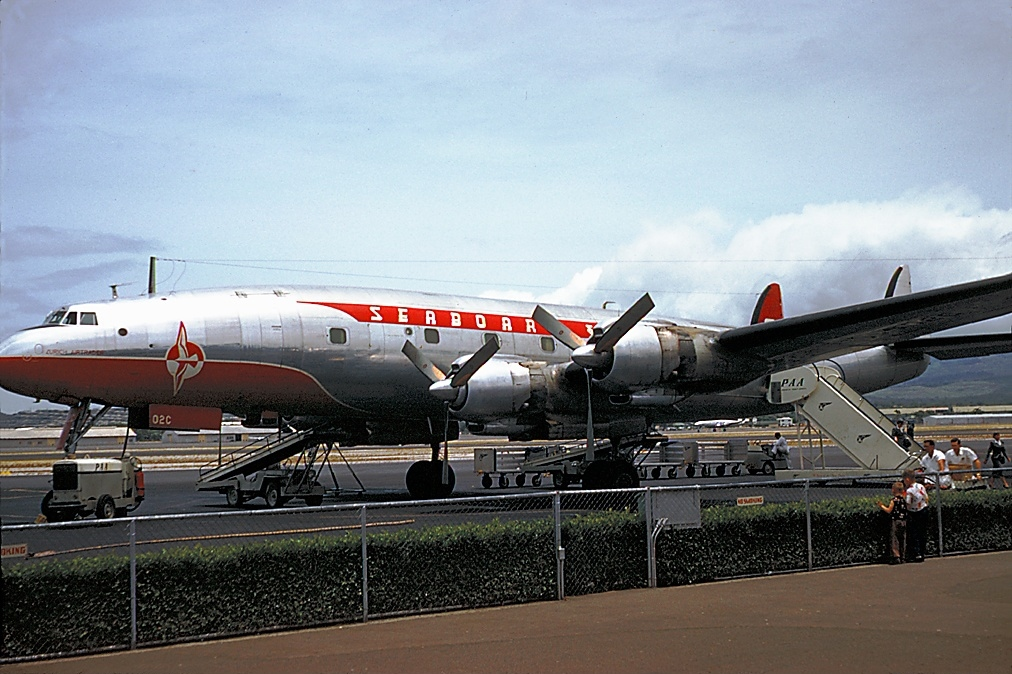
A L-1049D in Honolulu (1956).

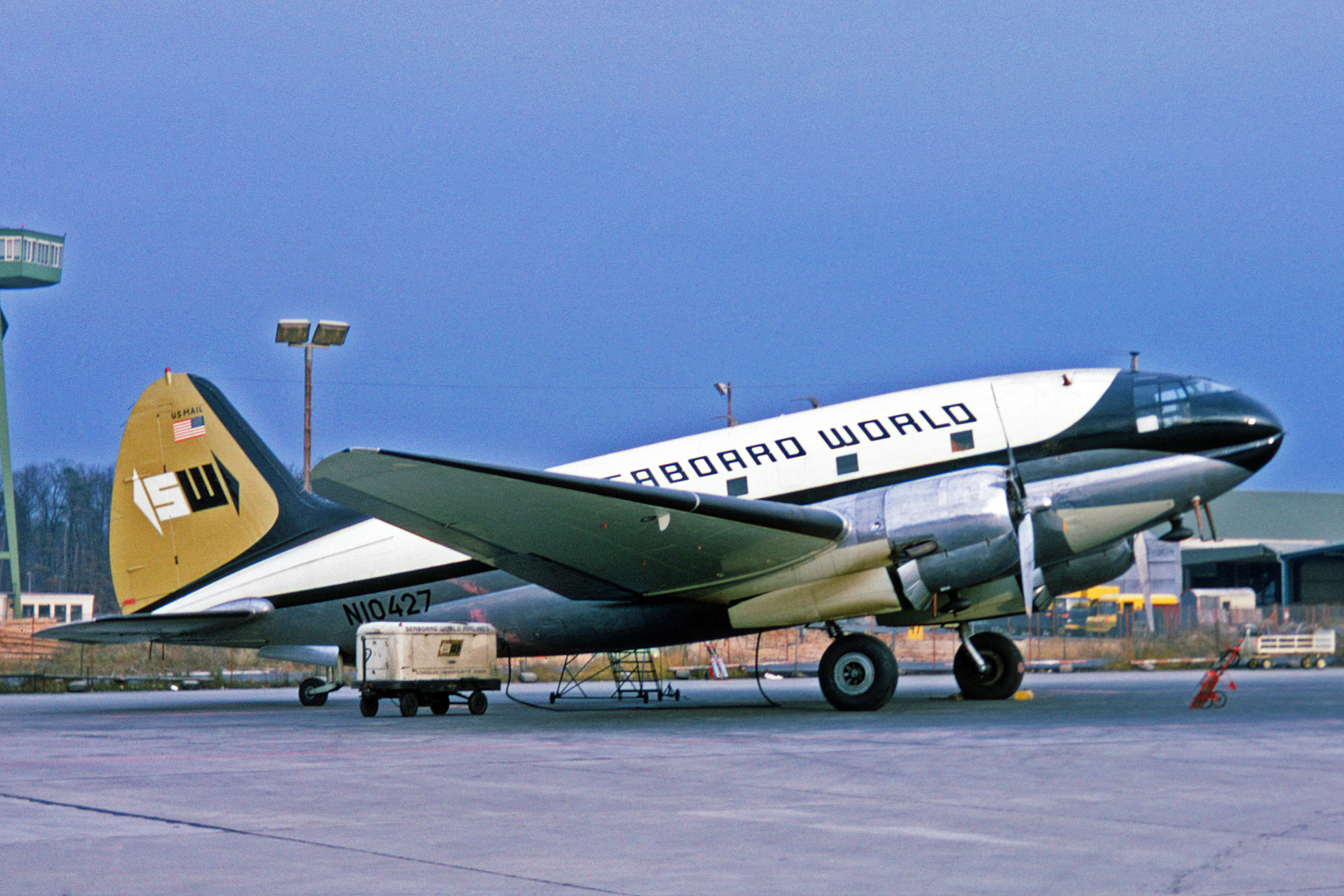
A C-46 in Frankfurt (1967).

During the Vietnam War in the late 1960s, the company used Douglas DC-8-63 jets to connect McChord Air Force Base, Washington with Cam Ranh Bay, Vietnam. In 1968, one of these flights operating as Seaboard World Airlines Flight 253A was forced to land in the Soviet Union with 214 American troops on board.

On 30 April 1969, a Seaboard World Airlines DC-8 with 219 passengers and 13 crewmembers landed by mistake at Marble Mountain Air Facility, when it had actually been cleared to land at the nearby Da Nang Air Base. After fuel and passengers were offloaded, the plane was towed to the north overrun and departed five hours after the landing incident. See External links for a video of the DC-8 departing Marble Mountain.

Seaboard was the first airline to fly a 747 Freighter service from the UK to the USA.

The airline merged with Flying Tiger Line on October 1, 1980, resulting in the loss of its corporate identity.

== Fleet ==
Seaboard World Airlines fleet
Type	Number
Boeing 707-345C	2
Boeing 747-245F	4
Boeing 747-273C	1
Canadair CL-44	8
Curtis C-46 Commando	2
Douglas DC-3	1
Douglas DC-4	14
Douglas DC-8-54F	3
Douglas DC-8-55F	9
Douglas DC-8-63CF	6
Lockheed L-1049D "Super Constellation"	4
Lockheed L-1049G "Super Constellation"	1
Lockheed L-1049H "Super Constellation"	4

== See also ==
- List of defunct airlines of the United States
