= Donecle =

French aircraft manufacturer

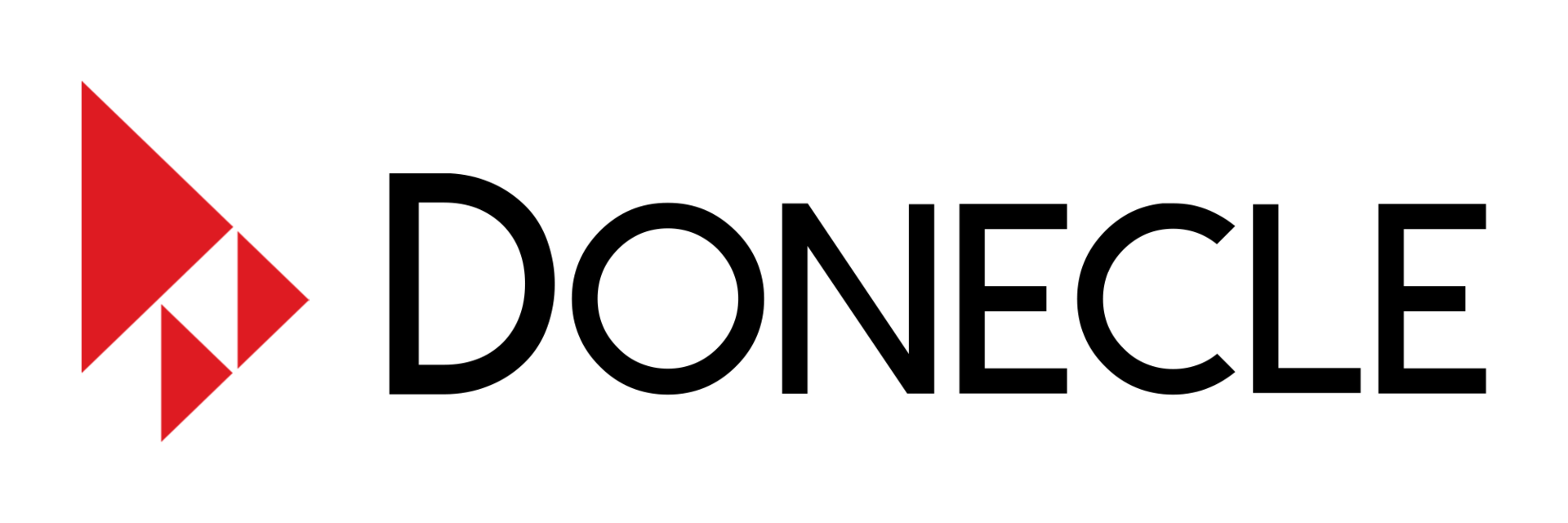
- Company type: SAS
- Industry: Aerospace
- Founded: September 2015 in Labège, Haute-Garonne, France
- Founder: Yann Bruner; Matthieu Claybrough; Josselin Bequet; Alban Deruaz-Pepin
- Headquarters: Toulouse, France
- Products: Autonomous aircraft inspection UAVs

Donecle is a Toulouse-based aircraft manufacturer which develops autonomous aircraft inspection UAVs. The company offers single UAVs and swarms of UAVs to visually inspect the exterior of airliners.

Autonomous navigation of the UAVs is based on laser positioning technology. UAVs take pictures of the aircraft with high resolution cameras. Image processing and machine learning algorithms analyse the images. The system then provides a diagnostic of the aircraft surface to a qualified inspector, who reviews the images and validates or refutes the provided analysis.

The company works with airlines such as Air France Industries-KLM and aircraft manufacturers such as Dassault Aviation and is one of the players in the field of aeronautical maintenance automation.

== History ==
=== Background ===
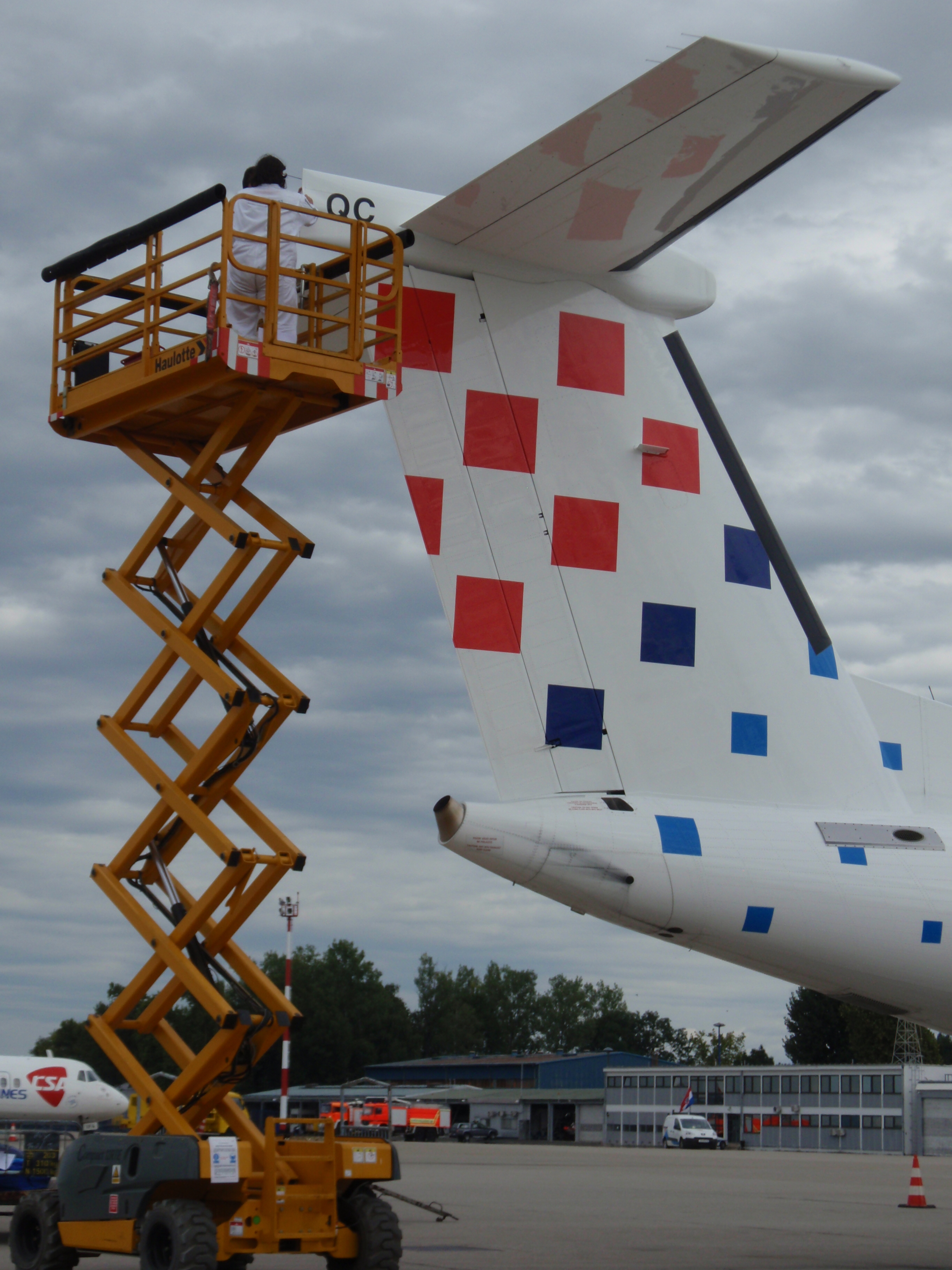
UAVs simplify the examination of the upper parts as the vertical tail part illustrated in the photograph.

Aircraft manufacturers, such as Airbus, Boeing and ATR, and certification bodies, such as the Federal Aviation Administration (FAA) and the European Aviation Safety Agency (EASA), require regular visual inspections of the entire external surface of the aircraft to assess the condition of their structures. About 80% of the required inspections are visual. All aircraft are visually inspected prior to each flight, as part of scheduled maintenance operations and after unplanned events such as a lightning strike, hail storm or other possible external damage. One possible solution to improve the traceability of these operations and reduce costs is the robotization of aeronautical maintenance and its visual inspections.

In January 2013, the French research and development project Air-Cobot began to develop a collaborative mobile robot capable of inspecting an aircraft during maintenance operations. Carried out by the Akka Technologies group, this multi-partner project involved research laboratories and companies, including Airbus. In 2014, in partnership with the Bristol Robotics Laboratory, the British airline easyJet became interested in drones guided by technicians to reduce the inspection time of aircraft fuselages.

=== Foundation ===
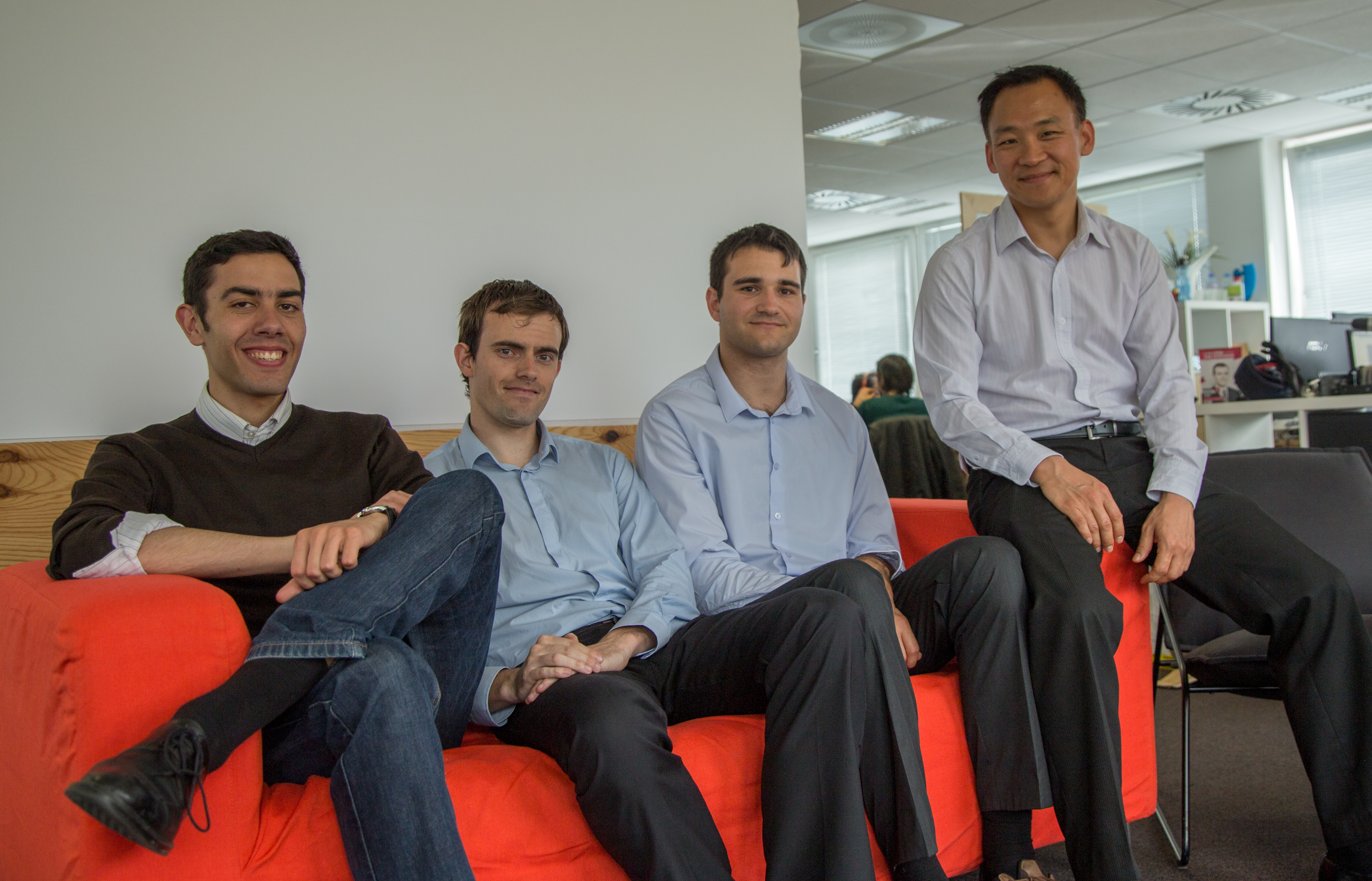
Founders of Donecle, from left to right, Josselin Bequet, Matthieu Claybrough, Alban Deruaz-Pepin et Yann Bruner.

After thirteen years in the design offices of the European aircraft manufacturer Airbus on the A400M and A350 aircraft with metal and composite materials, Yann Bruner, an engineer at Mines ParisTech with a PhD in Mechanics and Materials, noted that maintenance inspection reports are often incomplete for various reasons such as missing photographs, missing information, or illegible handwriting. He considered the use of drones to perform the inspection automatically. He contacted Matthieu Claybrough, who was involved in UAV projects at the Institut supérieur de l'aéronautique et de l'espace. A graduate of the Ecole Polytechnique, Claybrough has a specialization in innovation management, aeronautics and control theory. For three years he worked on the design of automatic pilots for aircraft, including helicopters for Thales Avionics, an avionics supplier.

Two other partners joined them in the project. The first was Josselin Bequet, a graduate of the École supérieure de commerce de Paris (ESCP Europe) and the City, University of London who specializes in management and finance. The second was Alban Deruaz-Pepin, who graduated from the Institut Supérieur de l'Aéronautique et de l'Espace (ISAE-SUPAERO) and specializes in computer science and control theory, and holds a private pilot license. They founded the startup, Donecle, in September 2015 and developed an automated inspection procedure for aircraft with a swarm of UAVs. In June of That same year they presented their concept at the Paris Air Show.

=== Product ===
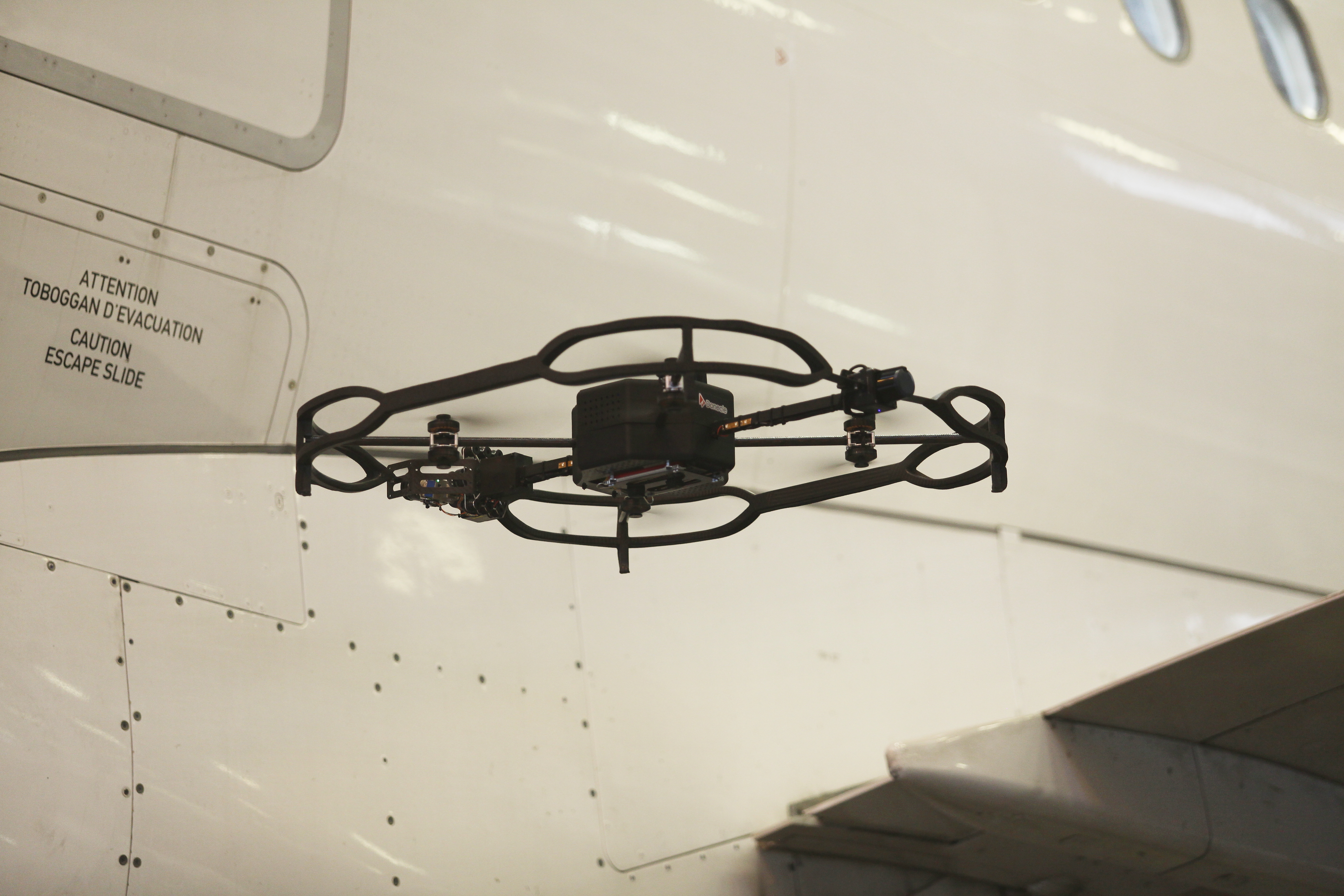
Donecle's autonomous UAV inspecting an airliner.

Although regulations and weather make it difficult to use UAVs in airspace near airports, Donecle developed a product that works both indoors and outdoors, using a laser positioning system for its UAVs. During the autonomous flight, cameras mounted on the UAVs photograph the exterior surface of the aircraft. Algorithms analyse the images and provide a diagnostic report about the aircraft surface. A human operator chooses a flight plan for the required inspection and a qualified inspector then validates the reports.

Compared to human inspections that require scaffolding, inspection of the outer surface of a typical airliner with drones takes about twenty minutes versus six to ten hours and requires one person versus ten to twenty. The cost of taking an aircraft out of service can run at approximately $10,000 per hour, which makes UAV inspection cost effective. Donecle has filed patents for this process.

=== Development ===
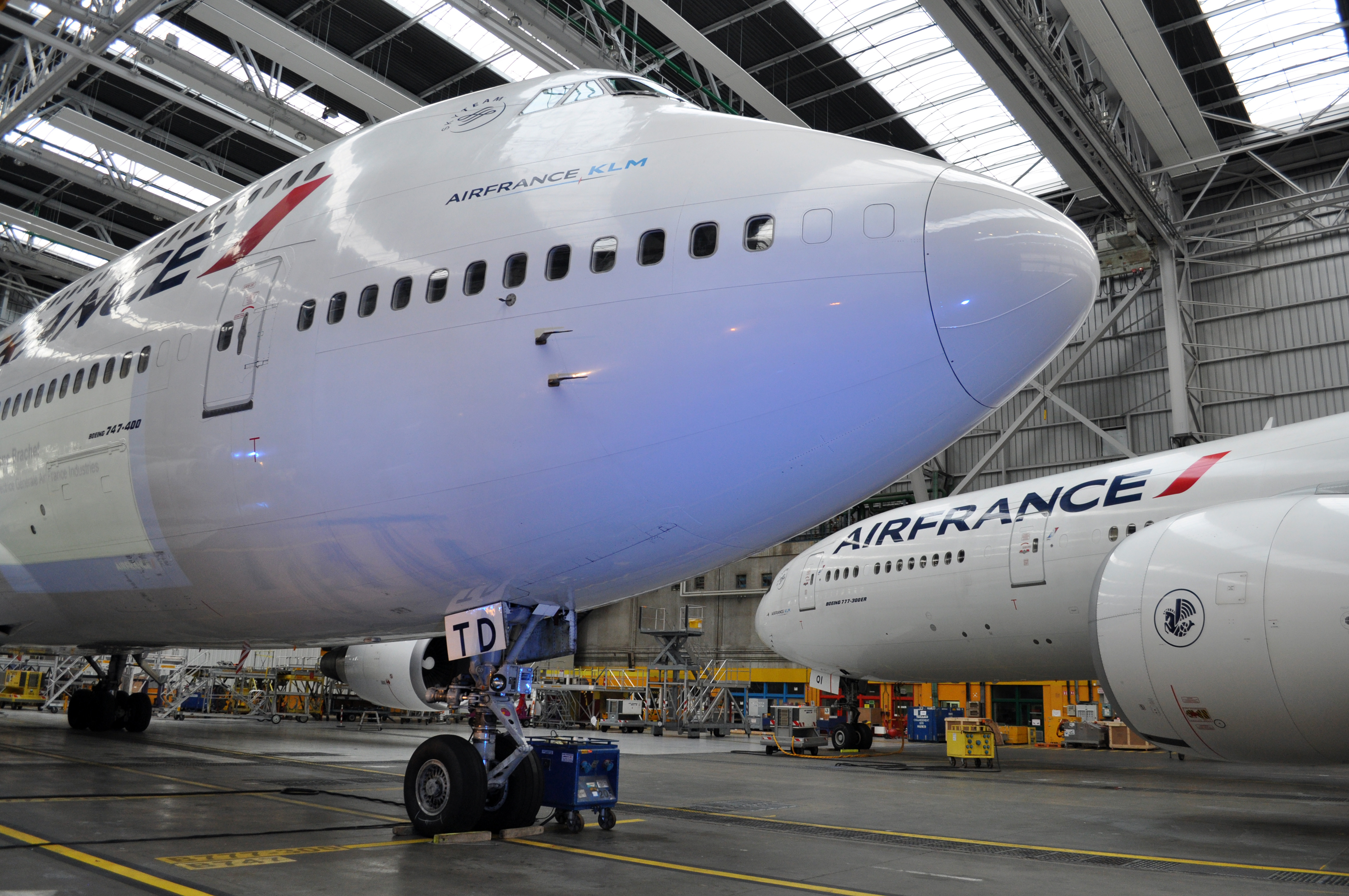
Donecle has a partnership with Air France Industries-KLM Engineering and Maintenance.

Inspections use a set of mobile Internet of Things (IoT) sensors, so at its inception in 2015, Donecle joined the Connected Camp, a business incubator in this field, located in the IoT Valley of Labège, a town south-east of Toulouse. The incubator aids the search for funding and provides some common equipment such as 3D printers. Donecle is a member of the Aerospace Valley competitiveness cluster, the Robotics Place cluster and the Hardware Club. In October 2016, it became a member of the Starburst Accelerator, the world's largest incubator for aerospace startups.

In 2016, the company announced a partnership with the French-Dutch aeronautical maintenance group Air France Industries-KLM Engineering and Maintenance (AFI-KLM E&M). The UAVs were tested on their aircraft to verify the marking and detection of defects. At the end of this testing and verification phase, AFI-KLM and Donecle planned to jointly deploy the equipment at AFI-KLM E&M maintenance sites.

At the end of 2016, DDrone Invest, an investment company controlled by the French company Delta Drone, invested one million euros in Donecle. With this capital injection, the company became a shareholder, alongside the founders. At the Paris Air Show in 2017, the company announced that it was starting to sign its first contracts with air carriers and planned commercial deployment by the end of the year. During the year, the startup was planning to increase its workforce and to attract international clients.

In 2018, at the ADS Show, a trade show for aerospace and defense maintenance, Donecle conducted a drone inspection of a Dassault Rafale, the French multirole combat aircraft. In the future, the company intends to offer other types of inspections, such as quality control of exterior paint and the evaluation of corrosion. Planning is also underway for applications outside aviation, such as rail transport, shipbuilding and wind farms.

== Technologies ==
=== Autonomous navigation ===
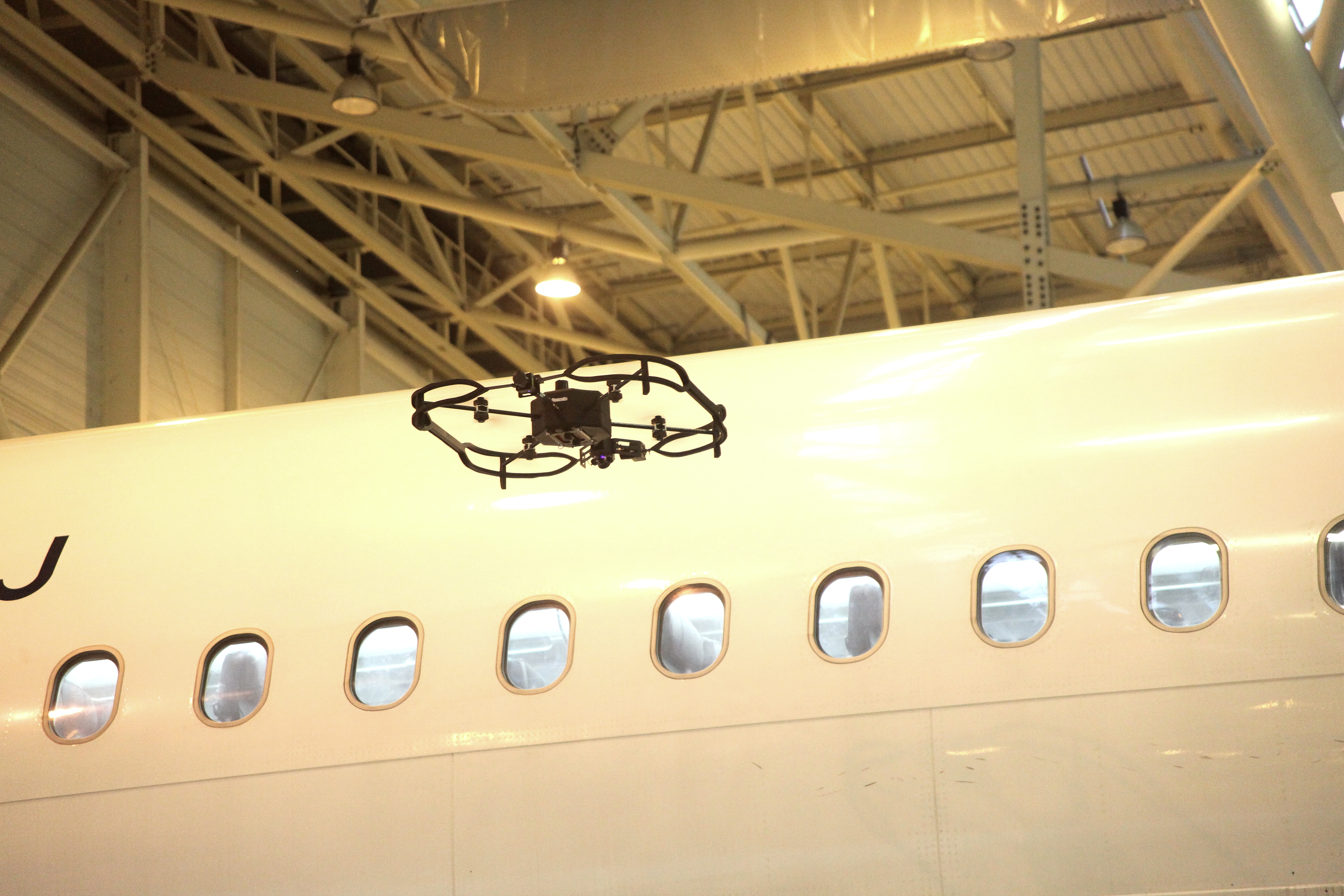
Donecle's autonomous UAV inspecting an aircraft.

The Donecle UAV is a coaxial push-pull octocopter. The UAVs position themselves relative to the aircraft with laser positioning technology. This allows them to operate in enclosed areas, such as hangars, without the need for geolocation with Global Positioning System (GPS). Algorithms compute in real time the position of the UAV relative to the aircraft. The sensors used for autonomous navigation also ensure safe operation, by preventing collisions with aircraft, human personnel and equipment.

The navigation plans and the number of UAVs employed in each case depend on the aircraft model to be analyzed. A single UAV is enough for a small airplane while up to six UAVs can be used for an Airbus A380. As the inspection missions are always the same, the routes are pre-programmed in the software installed on a tablet computer. A human operator does not need to pilot the UAVs, but only launches the mission and then the UAVs fly autonomously around the aircraft. They normally fly at a distance of one meter from the fuselage.

=== Visual inspection ===
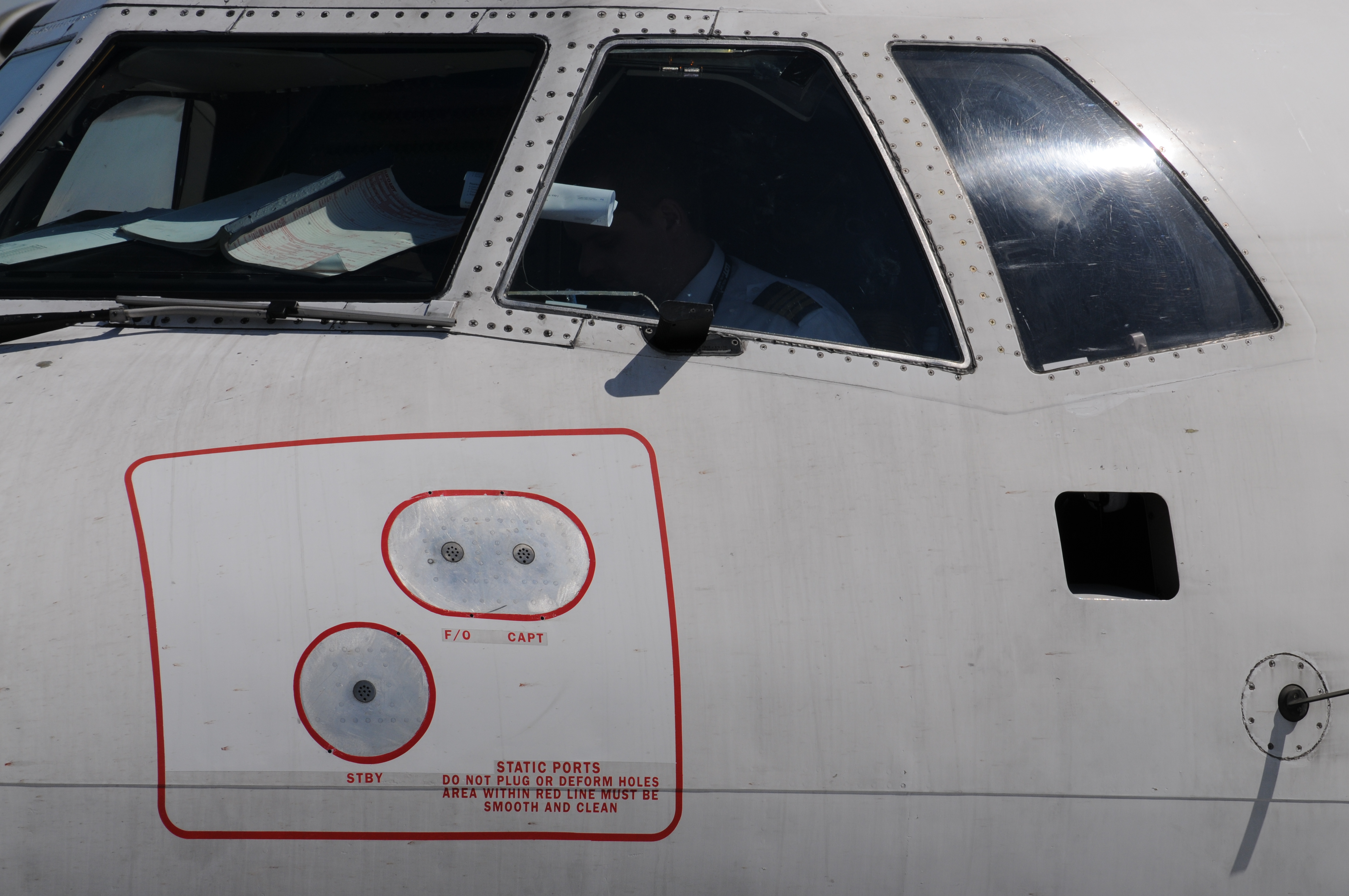
Image processing software control the quality of regulatory markings.

The high-resolution cameras mounted on the UAVs photograph the surface of the aircraft. Image processing algorithms perform the first step of detecting any region of interest on the fuselage. A second step of classification is then carried out in order to categorize defects (lightning strike, oil leak, scratching, texture irregularity, etc.) versus normal elements of the aircraft (screws, rivets, pitot tubes, etc.). The recognition algorithm is based on machine learning from the annotated databases of previous flights.

The effectiveness of deep learning algorithms depends on the representativeness and the quantity of examples in each class. Databases suffer from the fact that there is only a small number of defects compared to the huge amount of normal elements present on an aircraft. The defects are, however, the most critical objects to classify. To overcome this difficulty, Donecle has done research to extend image annotations, using classical image processing techniques and generative adversarial networks. Other alternatives also considered include one-shot learning, which allows learning information about object categories from a single image, or a small number of training images.

Diagnostics are provided in real time. Applications include fault detection and quality control of regulatory markings. At the end of the mission, a damage report is sent to a tablet computer with each region of interest and its proposed classification. The algorithm returns a confidence rate on its diagnosis. An inspector reviews at the images and validates or refutes the diagnostics.

=== Operational testing ===
The company's drone were employed in operational tests by Austrian Airlines in September 2019.

== Awards and recognition ==
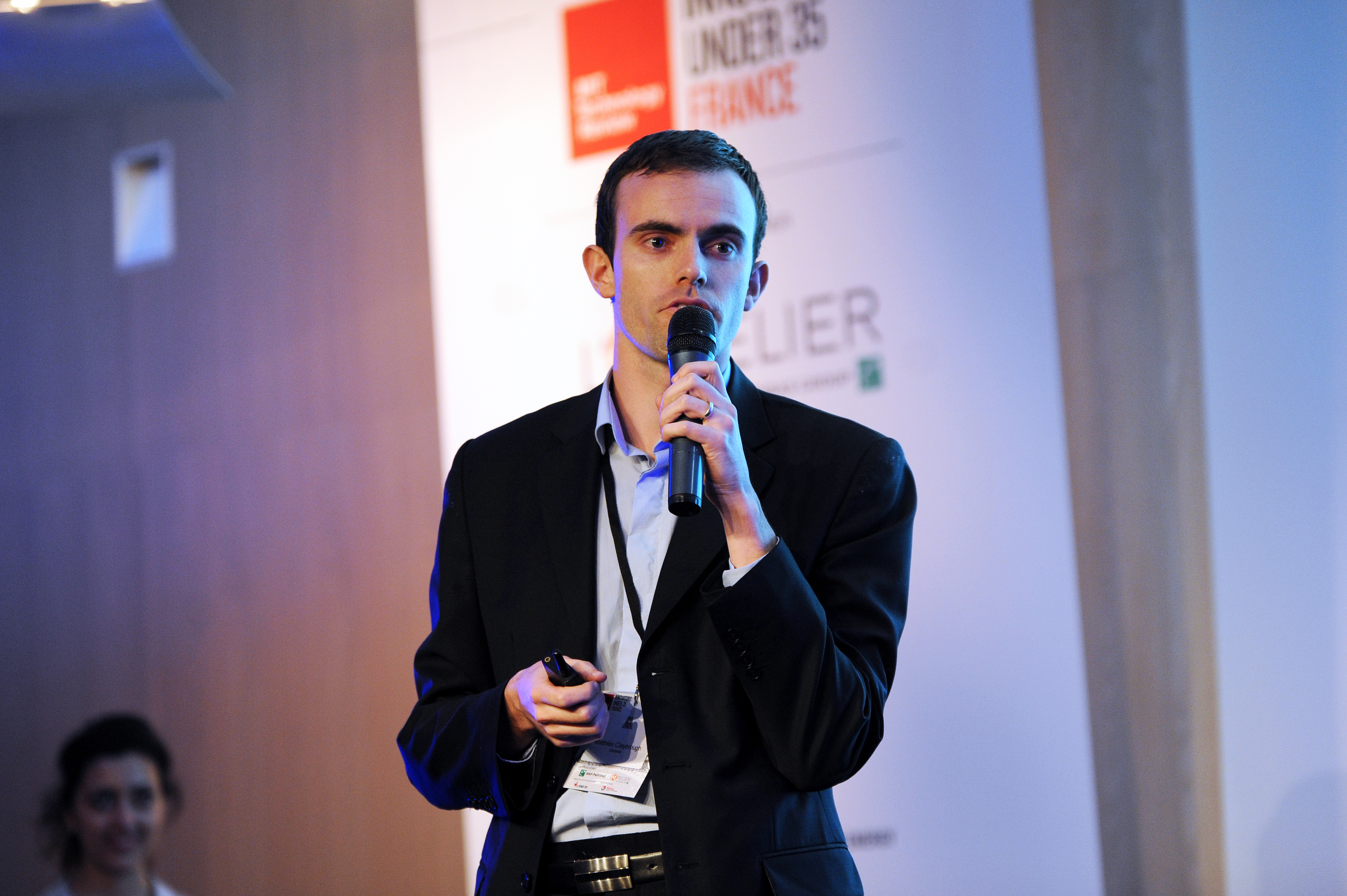
Matthieu Claybrough during award ceremony of MIT Technology Review in 2016.

The startup and its founders have received the following awards:

- 2016 Jean-Louis Gerondeau - Zodiac Aerospace award given by the foundation of the école polytechnique
- 2016 Galaxie Grand Prize by Galaxie club
- 2016 Massachusetts Institute of Technology Innovators under 35 France, organized by MIT Technology Review
- 2016 Young Engineer award - Technology and Aerospace by Norbert Ségard Foundation
- 2016 La Tribune BNP Paribas Young Entrepreneur award in the "start category"
- 2016 Start me up first Innovation contest, organized by the Crédit Agricole Toulouse 31
- 2016 Trophy of Innovation of the Aeromart business convention
- 2017 Special Jury Award of French national competition for outdoor robotics
- 2017 Disruptive Strategy Award in the startup category for the Grand-Sud region
- 2018 Grand Prize of the 37th Inn'Ovations regional competition in the Midinnov show
- 2020 Aviation Week Network Laureate in the maintenance, repair and overhaul category

== See also ==
- Aircraft maintenance checks
- UAV
- Air-Cobot
