= European Aerospace Cluster Partnership =

The European Aerospace Cluster Partnership (EACP) is a permanent partnership between collaborating European aerospace clusters. The consortium currently comprises 45 aerospace clusters from 18 countries and was initiated by the city of Hamburg in 2009 and co-funded by the European Commission.

== History ==
The European Aerospace Cluster Partnership was established in 2009, within the framework of CLUNET, a PRO INNO EUROPE project that encouraged the exchange of experiences and support for implementing concrete pilot projects relating to cluster innovation and policy development. The EACP has sinced developed into a permanent partnership between collaborating European aerospace clusters. Limited to the aerospace industry, the partnership also serves as a benchmark project for other industry sectors. In 2013, the EACP was recognized by the European Commission as one of 13 “European Strategic Cluster Partnerships“ (ESCP). With this acknowledgement, the Commission formally recognizes the EACP’s efforts to improve global competitiveness by supporting pan-European collaboration and implementing joint strategies needed to enter new markets outside of Europe.

== Networking Hub ==
The EACP is a networking hub that gives European aerospace clusters a permanent platform for information exchanges, policy studies and mutual cooperation. It is managed by Hamburg Aviation, which is why Hamburg constitutes the focal point for all partners. Hamburg screens calls from the European Union for certain thematic domains, gathers international project proposals, supports the search of project partners and pools all contacts of 45 different aerospace regions in Europe. For more information, see: Hamburg Aviation

== Mode of operation ==
The EACP network operates in an informal, decentralized, and flexible way that is based on an organizational set of continuous working groups (Skills, Technology, Strategy, Supply Chain, and Internationalization), temporary project consortia; and bi- or multilateral ad hoc partnerships. The main objective resides in the global competitiveness in Europe through intense inter-cluster collaboration. This goal is pursued within the three major fields of action: Knowledge exchange (cluster excellence, funding schemes, and role of clusters); pushing innovation (skills & qualifications, EU projects, and connecting member clusters); and strengthening the position of the EU (internationalization, supply chain infrastructure, and global competitiveness). All EACP activities follow these guidelines to improve competitiveness in a European context.

== Goals ==
The EACP seeks to establish closer inter-cluster relations in order to provide added value to the overall market. It therefore shapes the relationship between clusters, industry stakeholders and policy makers. The EACP further stimulates the creation of innovation, thereby aiming to strengthen the EU’s overall position in the global aerospace market. Its primary objectives can be divided into the following categories:

- Knowledge exchange: To enable inter-cluster knowledge exchange, presentations and discussions on best practices are conducted at regular EACP meetings. Participation in the European Strategic Cluster Partnership (ESCP) allows for the exchange of experience and knowledge regarding economic, political and social developments that affect aerospace and other industry sectors. Thus, regional clusters are not only prepared for possible future developments, but also work to advance cluster excellence. In order to optimise the member clusters’ use of funding schemes, regional, national and EU calls are constantly monitored and evaluated. In close connection to this, information regarding compulsory regional smart specialization strategies is refined and spread to the clusters.
- Push innovation: The second main objective is pursued by developing skills and qualifications among the existing and future aerospace workforce. Examples include the Skills Hub project as well as the establishment of other EU-projects that specifically target technological innovation, such as the projects CARE and BeAware or CANNAPE. These and other projects are supplemented by EACP match-making events, as part of which EACP unites actors from industry and R&D to develop new ideas needed to improve technology, products and processes. Amont other things, EACP actively supports opportunities to initiate B2B cooperation, such as AEROMART, the European Cluster Collaboration Platform (ECCP), EU missions for growth and the Enterprise Europe Network (EEN).
- Strengthening the EU-position: The third main objective is put forward through a number of activities related to the continued internationalisation of the member clusters, their regions and resident companies. A crucial factor in this regard is the development of a competitive aerospace supply chain in the EU. Specific problems faced by suppliers are to be monitored and integrated into the EU technology roadmap. In order to improve the EU’s global competitiveness in the aerospace sector, a strategic assessment of future technological fields as well as collaborations with strategic actors are planned. In this manner, the EACP also supports the efforts of other institutions such as ASD, ACARE, CleanSky, EASN, Sesare and EEN. The EACP also strives to improve international collaboration with partners from outside of Europe. Numerous partners from other parts of the world, such as Canada, the USA, Brazil, Russia, Japan and China are involved in the international efforts of the network. The EACP supports company missions to and from these regions.

== Members ==
The EACP encompasses a total of 45 clusters from 18 EU and neighbouring countries. EACP membership is open to aerospace clusters in member states of the European Union and adjacen countries. In order to be admitted to the network, a member must represent all segments of the regional aerospace sector. These include: industry, R&D and administrative bodies. The main focus should be on civil aviation, with a minimum of 60% of the represented stakeholders hailing from this background.

- ACstyria Mobilitätscluster GmbH, AT
- AED - Portugal, PT
- Aragonian Aerospace Cluster (AERA), ES
- AÉRIADES, FR
- Aerospace Cluster Association (ACA), TR
- Aerospace Cluster Rhônes-Alpes Auvergne, FR
- Aerospace Cluster Sweden (ACS), SE
- Aerospace Lombardia, IT
- Aerospace Valley, FR
- Aerospace Wales Forum (AWF), UK
- ASTech Paris Region, FR
- AVIASPACE BREMEN e. V., GER
- Aviation Valley, PL
- bavAIRia e.V., GER
- Berlin-Brandenburg Aerospace Alliance (BBAA), GER
- DAC, IT
- Distretto Tecnologico Aerospaziale (DTA), IT
- Eskisehir Aviation Cluster (ESAC), TR
- Flemish Aerospace Group (FLAG), BE
- Hamburg Aviation (HAV), GER
- Basque Aerospace Cluster (HEGAN), ES
- Fundación Hélice, ES
- International Aviation Services Centre (IASC), IE
- Invest Northern Ireland, UK
- IR4I Aerospace Cluster, IT
- Lazio CONNECT, IT
- Luft- und Raumfahrt Baden-Württemberg (LR BW), GER
- Competence Center for Aerospace and Space Technology Saxony/Thuringia (LRT), GER
- Madrid Cluster Aeroespacial, ES
- Midlands Aerospace Alliance, UK
- Moravian Aerospace Cluster, CZ
- Normandie Aerospace (NAE), FR
- Netherlands Aerospace Group (NAG), NL
- Niedersachsen Aviation, GER
- Northwest Aerospace Alliance (NWAA), UK
- OPIAR, RO
- OSSA, TR
- Safe Cluster, FR
- SAHA Istanbul, TR
- Skywin Wallonia, BE
- Swiss Aerospace Cluster, CH
- Torino Piemonte Aerospace, IT
- Ukrainian Aerospace Cluster, UKR
- Ulyanovsk Avia, RU
- West of England Aerospace Forum (WEAF), UK

== Projects ==
Bridging East and West for Aerospace Research (BEAWARE)↵ The BEAWARE consortium aimed to connect the leading aerospace clusters and support organisations in Western Europe (France, Germany, United Kingdom, Spain and Italy) with rapidly evolving aerospace clusters and strongholds in Eastern Europe (Poland, Romania, Czech Republic, Slovakia and the Baltic States). This aimed to create the necessary conditions to utilise the existing and emerging potential in the field of aeronautics and air transport for a continuous and sustainable contribution to European aerospace programmes and projects.

CANNAPE: CANNAPE was a European “Coordinating & Support Action” project that was implemented as part of the European Framework Programme 7 from June 2011 to May 2013. With the consortium composed of aerospace R&D stakeholders from both Europe and Canada, the initial main objectives were:

- To increase exchange between the Canadian and European research communities
- To raise awareness for opportunities regarding aeronautics and air transport research collaboration between Europe and Canada
- To develop a technology roadmap outlining capabilities and technology priorities for

international collaboration

- To increase the involvement of Canadian companies, research organisations and universities in FP7 projects and beyond (Horizon 2020)

With Hamburg Aviation and Aerospace Valley, two cluster members of EACP were official members of the CANNAPE consortium. After a major kick-off event organised as part of the Le Bourget Airshow at the Canadian Embassy in Paris in June 2011, four technical workshops were held on either side of the Atlantic. Their key aim resided in the identification of research topics that are of interest to both Canadian and European R&D players.

Clean Aerospace Regions (CARE): CARE was a three-year European CSA project that fostered greener aviation and related research and development activities. Placing particular focus on SMEs and labs, this was achieved through cooperation between regional aerospace clusters and the adoption of a harmonised agenda approach. In order to reach a sustainable degree of competitiveness, the European aviation industry - from OEMs to SMEs – must take on an increasingly ecological and innovative approach. Green technologies are key competitive advantages of all future air transport systems. For SMEs in the innovative and forward-looking green aerospace sector, a sufficient balance between today’s business growth requirements and tomorrow’s stakes must be found. Thus, as the backbone of the European economy, SMEs require special support and attention. The European clusters are rooted in both the local and regional economy. They know exactly what their region requires and have an up-to-date view of their (regional) position within green aviation. The CARE methodologies allowed for a comparison between cluster profiles and enabled other clusters to join the CARE Meta Cluster. An initial study identified major technological fields which bear potentially high impacts on the European aviation ecosystem and were thus of significant relevance to all participating regions and clusters. In order to gain an overview on the strengths and weaknesses of these technological fields in our regions, the CARE project conducted a comprehensive SWOT analysis. Last but not least, it defined a „Joint Action Plan” that included 21 concrete actions and aims to strengthen the competitiveness of SMEs and labs.

Activities and Business from Real Opportunities for Aerospace Developments (ABROAD): ABROAD constitutes the first instance in which the EACP is executing its internationalization strategy and is a project in response to the EU’s COSME call under its Horizon 2020 programme. The ABROAD operational consortium is composed of 6 core partners who have the responsibility of ensuring the project evolution in terms of activities, studies and deliverables. The core partners are: Aerospace Valley (F), Hamburg Aviation (D), Skywin (BE), Eskisehir Aviation Cluster (TR), Aragonian Aerospace Cluster (ES), Niedersachsen Aviation (D). The project duration is 24 months with the starting date in the beginning of 2016. All 34 EACP members will be able to reap the benefits from the project -namely from those that result from it but also insights, interim results and any other potential opportunities that arise from it. This way the chance to participate can be ensured to each and every EACP member as it is supposed to be in all projects within the EACP network. ABROAD is an ambitious project aiming at supporting the first implementation, testing and further development of the EACP's joint internationalization strategy. ABROAD therefore proposes a programme that will deepen existing links between the EACP's members and foreign regions with the determination of bringing European SMEs into international value chains by supporting new international businesses or the emergence of international R&T cooperation. ABROAD is an important step for the EACP as it will support the implementation of the internationalization of the Partnership, which is currently one of the four key-axes of development operated by the working groups for the Partnership. In the course of the project, at least six strategic target regions shall be defined, described and connected to the EACP.

Reaching Up to Excellence in Aerospace Cluster Management (RUE AERO): RUE AERO aims to foster excellence in regional cluster managements and to strengthen the European strategic partnership EACP as a whole. It stems from one of the Expressions of Interest for a European Strategic Cluster Partnership and seeks to bring about the means to give continuity to the European Clusters Collaboration Platform. The project will not only provide the means, but also the road-map and the drum-beat to improve the EACP partners’ quality of cluster management and to support at least 5 partners of the consortium achieving the next (higher) level of their corresponding label.

The project further intends to support more collaboration between the multiple aerospace clusters within Europe. Therefore, it will strengthen inter-cluster collaboration within the European Aerospace Cluster Partnership (EACP). The partner organisations will also exchange information on their current menu of services to SMEs. The collection of practices will provide a pool of ideas to the project partners. This pool of ideas helps the partners to further their cluster management excellence by allowing them to pick the most transferable and best actions for individual (or common if possible) implementation.

== Global Aerospace Cluster Summits ==
The 1st Global Aerospace Cluster Summit (GAC) took place during the Paris Airshow in 2017. The 2nd Global Aerospace Cluster Summit was held in downtown London during the framework of the Farnborough International Airshow 2018. Both the GAC17 and GAC18 had approximately 45+ participants with the GAC18 having cluster managers present from around the globe from 18 different countries: Austria, Belgium, Brazil, Canada, Czech Republic, Germany, Ireland, Italy, Japan, Mexico, Malaysia, Poland, Portugal, Romania, Singapore, Turkey, the United Kingdom, and the United States. There is no funding for the GAC, but will continue every year with the commitment of the EACP and support from industry and European Commission.
