= HXR =

HXR may refer to:

- HXR, handling instruction to confirm that the addressee has read the message in ARRL Radiograms
- Hard x-ray, measured by ASIO project under NASA mission Multi-slit Solar Explorer
- Clear Lexan HXR Sheet Series, 2015 winner of the Crystal Cabin Award
