= Hamburg Aviation =

German aviation organisation

- Abbreviation: Hamburg Aviation
- Formation: 2011
- Purpose: To support, promote and guide the development of the Aviation Cluster Hamburg Metropolitan Region
- Headquarters: Hamburg
- Managing Director: Ralf Gust
- Website: www.hamburg-aviation.com

Hamburg Aviation, formerly the "Luftfahrtcluster Metropolregion Hamburg e.V." (Aviation Cluster Hamburg Metropolitan Region) is an association of aviation organizations in Hamburg, Germany. Its goal is to promote the aviation industry in the Hamburg Metropolitan Region.

== Hamburg Metropolitan Region ==
Companies based in the Hamburg Metropolitan Region include the aircraft manufacturer Airbus and Lufthansa Technik. Hamburg Airport, which first opened in 1912, is one of the world's oldest operational airports to still be based at its original location. There are over 300 specialist suppliers, including branches of Diehl Aerospace. As of 2012, it had over 40,000 employees making it one of the largest sites for civil aviation in the world.

=== Educational institutions ===
- Hamburg University of Applied Sciences (HAW Hamburg)
- Helmut Schmidt University / University of the German Federal Armed Forces Hamburg
- Hamburg University of Technology (TUHH)
- University of Hamburg

Also based in Hamburg are the German Aerospace Center’s Institute of Aerospace Medicine and Institute of Air Transportation Systems.

=== Crystal Cabin Award ===
Hamburg is the host city of the annual Aircraft Interiors Expo, a trade show for the aircraft cabin industry. The Crystal Cabin Award was launched in 2007 to honour innovation in the field of cabin design. The prize is funded by sponsors from the aviation industry.

== Hamburg Aerospace Cluster ==
In 2001, companies, universities and government bodies collaborated forming Hamburg Aviation. This developed into the “Luftfahrtcluster Metropolregion Hamburg E.V.” association, with 15 founding members, officially established in 2011. Its mission statement is to promote the aviation industry in the Hamburg business cluster.

=== Recognitions and projects ===
- Leading-Edge Cluster competition
- Center of Applied Aeronautical Research
- European Aerospace Cluster Partnership
- Faszination Technik Klub

== Founding members ==
=== Commercial enterprises ===
- Airbus
- Lufthansa Technik AG
- Hamburg Airport

=== Associations ===
- Hanse-Aerospace E.V.
- HECAS – Hanseatic Engineering & Consulting Association
- German Aerospace Industries Association (BDLI)

=== Research facilities ===
- German Aerospace Center (DLR)
- Hamburg Centre of Aviation Training (HCAT)
- Center for Applied Aeronautical Research (ZAL)

=== Universities ===
- Hamburg University of Applied Sciences (HAW Hamburg)
- Hamburg University of Technology (TUHH)
- Helmut Schmidt University (HSU)
- University of Hamburg

=== Public sector ===
- HWF Hamburgische Gesellschaft für Wirtschaftsförderung mbH (Hamburg Business Development Corporation)
- Department of the Economy, Transport and Innovation (BWVI)

== See also ==
- Aviation
