= Interavia (magazine) =

Interavia was a Swiss monthly magazine on aerospace published in English, French, German and Spanish between 1946 and 1993: ISSN 0020-5168.

In September 1992, Interavia was the leader of the aerospace press with a magazine circulation of 42,602 as French press group fr:Le Revenu bought it from Jane's Information Group, a Thomson Corporation subsidiary at the time. It was to merge by October with monthly Aerospace World (circulation: 31,500) as Le Revenu also published Air & Cosmos (41,509) and Aéronautique et Astronautique (6,000), controlling 30% of the aerospace publications market with a FFR300 million revenue.

== See also ==
- Flight International
- Air & Cosmos
- 1946-1968, 23 années d’Interavia consultables dans Gallica brought by Musée Air France
