= Crystal Cabin Award =

Aviation industry design award

The Crystal Cabin Award is the only international award for innovative aircraft cabin products and concepts and was granted for the first time at the Aircraft Interiors Expo in Hamburg in 2007. An international judging panel made up of more than 20 academics, engineers, representatives of aircraft manufacturers and airlines along with specialist journalists evaluates the individual submissions and nominate three finalists in each category. The finalists are determined four weeks before the Aircraft Interiors Expo opens and the Award is granted.

== Winners ==
=== 2017 ===
Category	Winner	Product
Greener Cabin, Health, Safety & Environment	Airbus	Airbus ReTrolley
Electronic Systems	Global Eagle Entertainment Media	GEE In-Flight Entertainment Platform
Premium Class & VIP	Delta Air Lines	Delta One Suite
Passenger Comfort Systems	Diehl Aerospace in cooperation with Hochschule Luzern	power-line communications (PLC) for Aircraft
Material & Components	Vanema in cooperation with Boxmark	Octaspring
Passenger Comfort Hardware	Airbus in cooperation with Recaro und THK	Smart Cabin Reconfiguration
University	Hamburg University of Applied Sciences	Smart Onboard Wheelchair

=== 2016 ===
Category	Winner	Product
Greener Cabin, Health, Safety & Environment	Boeing	Clean Cabin - Fresh Lavatory
Industrial Design & Visionary Concepts	Zodiac Aerospace	Lifestyle
Electronic Systems	Lufthansa Systems	BoardConnect Portable
Premium Class & VIP	Etihad Airways	Etihad Airways B787 First Suites
Passenger Comfort Systems	B/E Aerospace	Viu Flex Lighting System
Material & Components	SEKISUI Polymer Innovations	Infused Imaging
Passenger Comfort Hardware	Rebel.Aero	Rebel.Aero
University	TU Delft: Manon Kühne	HeadRest

=== 2015 ===
Category	Winner	Product
Greener Cabin, Health, Safety & Environment	B/E Aerospace	Solar Eclipse
Industrial Design & Visionary Concepts	Embraer & PriestmanGoode	E2 New Cabin Interior
Material & Components	SABIC Innovative Plastics	Leightweight, Clear Lexan HXR Sheet Series
Passenger Comfort Hardware	SII Deutschland	SANTO Seat
Passenger Comfort Systems	ViaSat Inc.	Exede In The Air
Premium Class & VIP	Etihad Airways	Etihad Airways A380 Upper Deck
University	Hamburg University of Applied Sciences: Marc Spille	Mobile Vacuum Trash Compactor

=== 2014 ===
Category	Winner	Product
Greener Cabin, Health, Safety & Environment	Diehl Aerospace	DACAPO® - Energy Autonomous Cabin
Industrial Design & Visionary Concepts	B/E Aerospace & TEAGUE	B/E Aerospace Advanced Lavatory
Material & Components	Schott AG	Laminated special glass composite
Passenger Comfort Hardware	ZIM Flugsitz GmbH	EC - 00
Passenger Comfort Systems	Lufthansa Technik AG	acWAP
Premium Class & VIP	Paperclip Design Limited	Caterpillar – Convertible Seating for Long Haul Flights
University	TU Delft: Anna-Louisa Peeters, Karand Shah & Dorine van Meeuwen	Sense the Transitions

=== 2013 ===
Category	Winner	Product
Greener Cabin, Health, Safety & Environment	Boeing	Insulated Galley Cart
Industrial Design & Visionary Concepts	Zodiac Aerospace	ISIS - Innovative Space Interior System
Material & Components	Diehl Aircabin	iPanel
Passenger Comfort Hardware	MERU	MERU Travelchair
Passenger Comfort Systems	Thales Group	Eye Tracking and Gesture Control
Premium Class & VIP	Dornier Technologie Systems GmbH	Glass PCU
University	Hamburg University of Applied Sciences: René Waldheuer & Bengt Brötzmann	Big Lavatory Concept

=== 2012 ===
Category	Winner	Product
Greener Cabin, Health & Safety	C&D Zodiac	C&D Zodiac Sidewall & Lining System
Industrial Design & Technical Concepts	B/E Aerospace & TEAGUE	B/E Aerospace Essence Inserts Collection
Material & Components	TTF Aerospace	TTF Aerospace Tskin™
Passenger Comfort	Lufthansa Systems	BoardConnect
Premium Class Products	C&D Zodiac	C3 Ultralounge
Visionary Concepts	Almadesign in cooperation with Amorim Cork Composites, Couro Azul, INEGI, SETsa and Embraer	LIFE

=== 2011 ===
Category	Winner	Product
Entertainment & Communication	The IMS Company	RAVE
Greener Cabin, Health & Safety	Elektro-Metall Export	Non Touch Waste Flap
Industrial Design & Interior Concept	Recaro Aircraft Seating GmbH & Co. KG	BL 3520
Material & Components	Lufthansa Technik AG	The world's thinnest colored Galley light
Passenger Comfort	Recaro Aircraft Seating GmbH & Co. KG	Air New Zealand SkyCouch
University	Munich University of Applied Sciences: Veronika Ruml, Marina Fischer und Bianca Herberth	Airgonomic
Judges Commendation Prize	THALES	Touch Passenger Media Unit

=== 2010 ===
Category	Winner	Product
Entertainment & Communication	Lumexis Corporation	Fiber-To-The-Screen ™
Greener Cabin, Health & Safety	Norduyn	NORDUYN Innovative Light Weight Trolleys
Industrial Design & Interior Concept	Teague	Integrated Smart Monitor
Material & Components	Airbus	Digital Cabin Logbook
Passenger Comfort	Dasell Cabin Interior GmbH	HILA high integrated flexible Lavatory
University	FH Hannover: Esther Gläsker	Seat Concept Com.pax
Judges Commendation Prize	Bishop GmbH	1 cm Seat Rail

=== 2009 ===
Category	Winner	Product
Entertainment & Communication	Lufthansa Technik AG	niceview
Greener Cabin, Health & Safety	Boeing - The Concept Center	Recyclable Aircraft Carpet
Industrial Design & Interior Concept	Recaro Aircraft Seating GmbH & Co. KG	SL 3510
Material & Components	B/E Aerospace	Aircraft vacuum waste systems
Passenger Comfort	Recaro Aircraft Seating GmbH & Co. KG	CL 3620
Judges Commendation Prize	James Lee	Paperclip armrest

=== 2008 ===
Category	Winner	Product
Entertainment & Communication	Airbus Deutschland GmbH	Universal Wireless Backbone System
Greener Cabin, Health & Safety	STG Aerospace	WEPPS Emergency Lighting
Industrial Design & Interior Concept	Dasell Cabin Interiors GmbH	Washroom and Urinals
Material & Components	Lufthansa Technik AG	UHF RFID Tag
Passenger Comfort	B/E Aerospace	First Class Suite
Judges Commendation Prize	Airbus Deutschland GmbH und AMSafe	Fire Suppression Concept and CARES

=== 2007 ===
Category	Winner	Product
Entertainment & Communication	Airbus GmbH	Flat Panel Speakers
Environmental	Lamera AB	Hybrix
Safety & Security	Weber Aircraft LP	Energy absorbing leg system
Future Concepts & Industrial Design	Lamera AB	Hybrix
Innovation & Technical Components	Lamera AB	Hybrix
Comfort & Health	Airbus GmbH	SPICE (Space Innovative Catering Equipment)

== See also ==
- Hamburg Aviation
