= Aviation Week & Space Technology =

American aerospace and aviation magazine

- Aviation Week & Space Technology cover, April 24-May 7, 2023
- Editor-in-Chief: Joseph C. Anselmo
- Editor: Bill Sweetman
- Former editors: Philip J. Klass; Anthony Velocci
- Categories: Aerospace
- Frequency: Weekly
- Publisher: Gregory D. Hamilton
- Founded: 1916; 110 years ago
- First issue: August 1916; 110 years ago
- Company: Informa
- Country: United States
- Based in: New York City, New York
- Language: English
- Website: aviationweek.com
- ISSN: 0005-2175

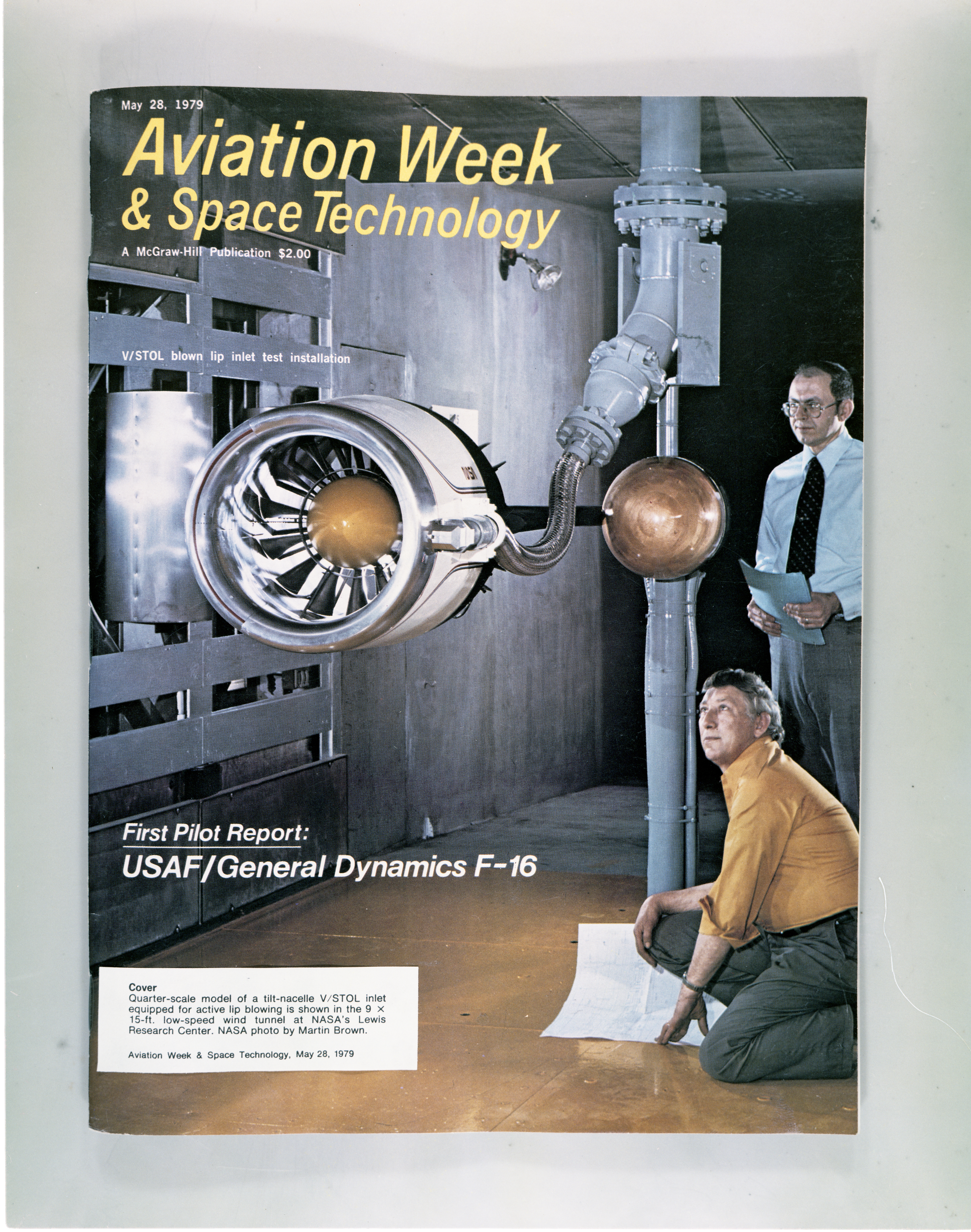
Aviation Week & Space Technology, May 28, 1979

Aviation Week & Space Technology, often abbreviated Aviation Week or AW&ST, is the flagship magazine of the Aviation Week Network, a division of Informa. The bi-weekly magazine is available in print and online, reporting on the aerospace, defense and aviation industries, with a core focus on aerospace technology.

The use of press releases to update the public led to the magazine being informally called "Aviation Leak and Space Mythology".

== History ==
The magazine was first published in August 1916 as Aviation and Aeronautical Engineering. In the autumn of 1920, the publication Aircraft Journal merged with Aviation and Aeronautical Engineering, and on 1 November 1920 the magazine was renamed to Aviation and Aircraft Journal to reflect the merger. With the first publication of the year on 2 January 1922, the magazine's name was shortened to Aviation "as it has been popularly known ever since its first appearance". The magazine would keep that name until 1947.

In May 1927, the publisher of the magazine changed from Gardner Publishing Corporation, Inc. (of Highland, N.Y.) to Aviation Publishing Corporation (of New York, N.Y.), following the retirement of Major Lester D. Gardner from operations in the magazine and his role as President, handing off his duties to "younger and more active shoulders." In the spring of 1929, Aviation Publishing Co. entered a deal to transfer publishing of the magazine to the McGraw-Hill Publishing Company. The magazine's editors were then employed by McGraw Hill. Starting on 9 March 1929, the magazine was published by McGraw-Hill.

On 11 August 1928, Aviation announced that Maj. Garner's name would be removed from the magazine, wherein he was symbolically listed as a "Director" although he wasn't an active staff member. The magazine cited conflicts with Maj. Garner's new role as President of the Aeronautical Chamber of Commerce of America, claiming that "the opinions expressed by Aviation might be embarrassing to him if his name remained on the magazine". Early editors Ladislas d'Orcy and Donald W. McIlhiney (1921 to 25) were Quiet Birdmen. Publisher Earl D. Osborn (1927–29) was also a Quiet Birdman.

Other titles the magazine has held include: Aviation Week (1947–1958), Aviation Week Including Space Technology (1958–1959), before settling on its current title in 1960 with the coming of the Space Age.

Starting in August 1943, McGraw-Hill published a weekly magazine called Aviation News to accompany the standard monthly issue. In 1947, its staff was reincorporated into the then-renamed Aviation Week.

== Editions ==
Once a month the magazine publishes an edition targeted at the maintenance, repair and overhaul business.

== Ownership and related products ==
Aviation Week & Space Technology is published by Aviation Week Network, a division of Informa. The magazine is headquartered in New York City, and its main editorial office is in Washington, D.C.

Its longest run of ownership came when it was owned by McGraw-Hill. It was sold by McGraw Hill to Penton in 2013. It became part of Informa when Informa purchased Penton in 2016.

Aviation Week Network also publishes Business & Commercial Aviation and Air Transport World magazines.

== Notable stories ==
=== Nuclear bomber hoax ===
The 1 December 1958 issue of Aviation Week included an article, "Soviets Flight Testing Nuclear Bomber", that claimed that the Soviets had made great progress in their own nuclear aircraft program. This was accompanied by an editorial on the topic as well. The magazine claimed that the aircraft was real beyond a doubt, stating that "A nuclear-powered bomber is being flight tested in the Soviet Union. ... It has been observed both in flight and on the ground by a wide variety of foreign observers from Communist and non-Communist countries." In reality, however, the article was a hoax. The aircraft in the photographs was later revealed to be an M-50 bomber and not a nuclear-powered plane at all.

=== Soviet reusable space shuttle ===
After finding a December 1976 Titan IIID launch was for a secret KH-11 spy satellite, Aviation Week & Space Technology editor Craig Covault agreed with the Chairman of the Joint Chiefs of Staff, Gen. David C. Jones to hold on the story, but received details on the Buran programme which were published on March 20, 1978. It revealed progressively the KeyHole Story after William Kampiles sold the KH-11 manual to a Soviet spy.

=== SR-72 (Son of Blackbird) revealing ===
The SR-72 is the proposed successor to the SR-71 Blackbird. There were unconfirmed rumors about the SR-72 dating back to 2007, when various sources disclosed that Lockheed Martin was developing a Mach 6 plane for the US Air Force. Such a development was confirmed on 1 November 2013, when the Skunk Works revelations were published about the development work on the SR-72 exclusively in Aviation Week & Space Technology. The magazine dubbed it 'The Son of Blackbird'. Public attention to the news was large enough to overwhelm the Aviation Week servers.

=== New, classified unmanned aircraft flying at Area 51 uncovering ===
In a December 9, 2013 cover story, Aviation Week & Space Technology revealed details about a highly classified intelligence, surveillance and reconnaissance stealth unmanned aircraft – the RQ-180 – that has been developed in secret by Northrop Grumman. The aircraft is currently flying at Area 51 in the Nevada desert and will become operational by 2015.

=== Lockheed Martin's secret Compact Fusion Reactor project details ===
In October 2014, Lockheed Martin's Skunk Works research lab gave Aviation Week editor Guy Norris access to a previously secret initiative to develop a compact fusion reactor that is small enough to power interplanetary spacecraft, ships and ultimately large aircraft that would virtually never require refueling. If successful, the groundbreaking project could shake up the global energy industry.

=== Vladimir Putin named Person of the Year ===
On its January 16, 2015 cover, Aviation Week & Space Technology named Russian President Vladimir Putin "The Notorious Mr. Putin - Person Of The Year." On its website, the magazine said that "no other person has had a more sweeping impact on aerospace and aviation—for better or worse—than Russian President Vladimir Putin. And for all but the most cynical of observers, Putin's far-reaching impact has definitely been for the worse. Because of this, he is Aviation Week's 2014 Person of the Year." The controversial issue caused a backlash among readers on its comments section and on social media.

== Past editors ==
The editors-in-chief of Aviation Week & Space Technology (and its past titles) have been:

| Name | Tenure |
|---|---|
| Lester D. Gardner | 1916–1921 |
| Ladislas d'Orcy | 1921–1925 |
| Donald W. McIlhiney | 1925 |
| W. Laurence LePage | 1925–1927 |
| Earl D. Osborn | 1927–1928 |
| R. Sidney Bowen, Jr, | 1928–1929 |
| Edward P. Warner | 1929–1935 |
| S. Paul Johnston | 1936–1940 |
| Leslie E. Neville | 1941–1947 |
| Robert H. Wood | 1947–1955 |
| Robert B. Hotz | 1955–1979 |
| William H. Gregory | 1979–1985 |
| Donald E. Fink | 1985–1995 |
| Dave North | 1995–2003 |
| Anthony Velocci | 2004–2012 |
| Joseph C. Anselmo | 2013–present |

== Publishers ==
| Publisher | Dates |
|---|---|
| Lester D. Gardner | 1916–1927 |
| Earl D. Osborn | 1927–1929 |
| McGraw-Hill Publishing Company | 1929–2013 |
| Penton Media | 2013–2016 |
| Informa Plc | 2016–present |

== See also ==
- Air & Cosmos, a similar French-language magazine from France
- Flight International, another aerospace sector industry journal
- Jane's Defence Weekly, another defense sector journal
- Air Transport World, sister publication of Aviation Week & Space Technology, focused on serving the airline management community.
