= Laboratory for Analysis and Architecture of Systems =

French research laboratory

- Abbreviation: LAAS-CNRS
- Formation: 1968
- Founder: Jean Lagasse
- Type: Research laboratory
- Legal status: Unité Propre de Recherche (UPR)
- Purpose: Academic research
- Professional title: UPR 8001
- Location: Toulouse, France
- Coordinates: 43.563545°N 1.476923°E
- Fields: Information science and technologies
- Members: Renatech, EuroNanoLab, IRN EURALIMMS
- Affiliations: CNRS
- Website: https://www.laas.fr/en/
- Remarks: "Always higher, always further in creativity and the joy of being together" (Jean Lagasse, founder of LAAS-CNRS)
- Formerly called: Laboratory of Automation and its Space Applications
- Unité Propre de Recherche (UPR): A research laboratory exclusively affiliated with CNRS

The Laboratory for Analysis and Architecture of Systems (LAAS-CNRS; French: Laboratoire d'analyse et d'architectures des systèmes) is a research laboratory affiliated to the French National Centre for Scientific Research (French: Centre national de la recherche scientifique, CNRS). LAAS-CNRS is recognised as a leading research unit in France with outstanding scientific influence by the High Council for the Evaluation of Research and Higher Education (Hcéres).

The facility is located near other important higher education facilities in Toulouse, France: the Paul Sabatier University, SUPAERO, the ENAC, the INSA, and other research centers (the ONERA and the CNES).

Founded in 1968, LAAS-CNRS has grown significantly. As of January 1, 2019, the laboratory consists of 577 people, including researchers, technical and administrative staff, and doctoral students, and is organised into 24 research groups across six scientific departments.

LAAS conducts research in computer science, robotics, automation, and micro and nano systems. In addition to its core research, LAAS actively promotes interdisciplinary collaboration through four strategic areas: Ambient Intelligence, Living Systems (including biology, environment, and medicine), Space, and Energy.

== History ==
Jean Lagasse founded LAAS-CNRS in 1968, first known as the Laboratory of Automation and its Space Applications (French: Laboratoire d'automatique et de ses applications spatiales) when automation was still a young field, computing was emerging, and robotics was in its infancy. Space exploration was a major scientific and geopolitical driver, and Lagasse convinced CNRS to establish a lab focused on automation and space applications.

Over time, LAAS-CNRS shifted its focus to complex systems across various domains.

== Activities ==
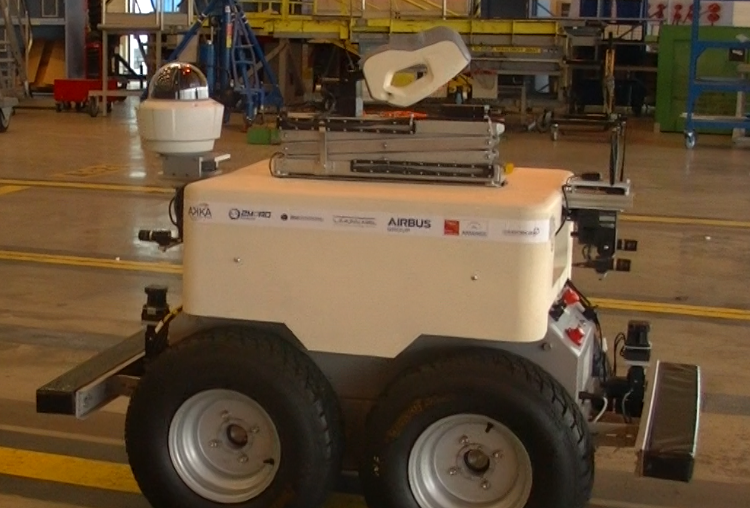
In industrial robotics, LAAS-CNRS participates in the French project Air-Cobot. Picture of the robot in an hangar of Air France Industries.

The laboratory's research focuses primarily on Information Sciences and Technologies. It is organised into six scientific departments:

Department	Acronym	Research focus
Decision and Optimization	DO	Design of mathematical laws and algorithmic techniques dedicated to control and decision problems.
Energy Management	GE	Addresses energy efficiency.
Microwaves and Optics: from Electromagnetism to Systems	HOPES	Exploitation of optical and microwave approaches to meet the challenges posed by the future Internet of Things and machine-to-machine communication.
Micro Nano Bio Technologies	MNBT	Development of materials, technologies, and devices.
Trustworthy Computing Systems and Networks	RISC	Development communicating networks and systems and associated applications.
Robotics	ROB	Development of perception, decision, movement generation and communication functions for robots.

These six scientific research departments represent twenty-four teams.

Its research spans automatic control, computing, micro- and nano-systems, and robotics, along with the following areas:

- Methods and Algorithms in Control
- Telecommunication Networks and Systems
- Qualitative Diagnosis and Supervisory Control
- Software and Tools for Communicating Systems
- Dependable Computing and Fault Tolerance
- Robotics and Artificial Intelligence
- Microsystems and Systems Integration
- Micro and Nano-structures Technologies
- Power Integration and Devices
- Photonics
- Microwave and Milli-meter Wave Integrated Components for Telecommunication
- Nano-addressing, Nano-biotechnologies
- Modelling, Optimisation and Integrated Management of Systems of Activities

== National and EU research networks ==
=== Renatech Network ===
The Micro and Nanotechnologies Platform features a clean room, one of the five national platforms within a network. Renatech is a French network of advanced micro and nanotechnology facilities coordinated by CNRS. Its goal is to provide national research and industry with access to top-tier infrastructure for high-level R&D projects in micro and nanotechnologies. Key features include 8,300 m² of clean rooms and 150 clean room engineers and technicians.

=== EuroNanoLab Network ===
Renatech is part of a distributed research infrastructure consisting of over 40 nanofabrication centers across Europe. Its goal is to accelerate research in micro- and nanotechnology by integrating fragmented facilities into a unified platform, providing researchers with quick access to state-of-the-art equipment and expertise. EuroNanoLab focuses on key areas such as quantum technologies, 2D materials, nanobiosciences, neuromorphic computing, and space exploration. It also facilitates the rapid transfer of technology to start-ups and SMEs. The initiative aims to address societal challenges in energy, health, and the environment and seeks international recognition as an ESFRI project.

EuroNanoLab is inspired by the NNIN (National Nanotechnology Infrastructure Network) in the US, which began in 2004, and follows a similar model of integrating research centers to provide collaborative access to nanofabrication resources.

== International collaborations ==
On October 10-11, 2024, the EURALIMMS IRN Europe/Asia network project was launched at the University of Tokyo, Japan, by a member of LAAS-CNRS. The network includes several leading institutions: CNRS (France), University of Tokyo (Japan), EPFL (Switzerland), NTU (Taiwan), University of Twente (Netherlands), SNU (South Korea), Helmholtz (Germany), and NUS/NTU (Singapore).

== See also ==
- Official website
