= Aviation Week Network =

American publishing and production company

The Aviation Week Network -- styled "Aviation Week Intelligence Network (AWIN)" -- is a New York–based B2B publishing and event production company owned by Informa. The company was owned and published by McGraw-Hill until it was purchased by Penton Media in 2013. It was then bought by Informa in 2016

The Aviation Week Network is best known for its flagship magazine, Aviation Week & Space Technology.

== Publications ==
The Aviation Week Network publishes several aerospace-and-defense related publications, including three major sector-specific print magazines: Aviation Week & Space Technology (the dominant U.S. news magazine of the aerospace industry), Business & Commercial Aviation (a prominent business aviation industry news-and-features magazine), and Air Transport World (the principal U.S. magazine of the commercial aviation industry). It distributes ShowNews via an app at major international air shows.

It also publishes a number of email market briefings targeted at the aerospace, defense, space, airline, business aviation and advanced air mobility sectors including Aviation Daily, Aerospace Daily & Defense Report, Advanced Air Mobility Report, SpeedNews and The Weekly of Business Aviation.

== Conference and events ==
Aviation Week Network's conference and exhibitions have predominantly specialized in the aircraft maintenance, repair and overhaul (MRO) industry for the past two decades. The group currently produces six MRO events around the world, with its flagship North American conference attracting some 10,000 attendees.

Since its acquisition by Penton Media, the group took over manufacturing and supply chain conferences, which are run under the SpeedNews banner.

Aviation Week Network runs two major awards ceremonies: Aviation Week's Laureate Awards and the Air Transport World Industry Achievement Awards. The Laureates focus on achievements in aerospace and defense technology and innovation, and have been dubbed the 'Oscars' of the aerospace industry. ATW's industry awards focus on airline achievements.

== Website ==
The group's website primarily comprises editorial content that is curated from its various publications. The majority of content is behind a subscriber-only paywall, but it also includes a selection of free-to-read articles alongside blogs, videos and photo galleries, which are all free to access. The website has 2.2 million monthly page views.

== Publication editors ==
- Aviation Week & Space Technology: Joseph C. Anselmo, Editor-in-Chief
- Air Transport World: Karen Walker, Editor-in-Chief
- Aerospace & Defense Daily: Jefferson Morris, Editor-in-Chief
- Aviation Daily: Mark Nensel, Managing Editor
- Advanced Air Mobility Report: Ben Goldstein, Managing Editor
- Business & Commercial Aviation: Lee Ann Shay, Editor-in-Chief
- The Weekly of Business Aviation: Molly McMillin, Managing Editor
- ShowNews: Thierry Dubois, Editor-in-Chief
- SpeedNews: Steve Costley, Managing Editor

== International partners ==
A number of publications in key markets outside the U.S. carry the Aviation Week Network logo on their masthead. These include Russia's Air Transport Observer; the Chinese-language CANNews, International Aviation, Business & General Aviation and Aviation Maintenance & Engineering.
