= Aviation Valley =

Aviation Valley – is an aviation cluster located in southeastern Poland, with historical links to the country's aerospace industry. Most of the members are located in the Subcarpathian Voivodeship (Podkarpackie Voivodeship), in the cities of Rzeszów, Mielec, Sędziszów Małopolski, Krosno and in the neighbouring regions. The Head Office is in Rzeszów.

== History ==
The Association was started by a group of aeronautic producers, suppliers and businessmen on April 11, 2003 as a non-profit organization, aiming to further the development and growth of the aerospace industry in this region, enabling it to provide a cross section of products and services. Among specific objectives are also: development of cooperation between various aviation manufactures, to reduce the cost in the supply chain, development of aerospace research and skills, cooperation with universities of technology and other aviation centers in Europe and abroad.

As of 2014, the Association represented 115 companies within the region, with several others in the process of applying for membership. They employ over 23.000 engineers, designers and technicians. Staff qualified to use CNC machines are provided by Rzeszów University of Technology's its Faculty of Mechanical Engineering and Aeronautics.

== Members ==
WSK „PLZ-Rzeszów” S.A., ZM „WSK-Rzeszów” Sp. z o.o., Rzeszów University of Technology, WSK „PZL-Krosno” S.A., ZPTSz „PZL-Mielec” Sp. z o.o., WSK – Tomaszów Lubelski, Siemens, MTU Aero Engines, Aero AT, BorgWarner, Ultratech Sp. z o.o., Hispano-Suiza, Pratt&Whitney Kalisz, SANDVIK Polska Sp. z o.o., Wentworth Tech. Sp. z o.o., Zakład Narzędziowy „PZL-Dębica” Sp. z o.o, Hamilton Sundstrand, Ultratech Sp. z o.o., Rzeszów RDA, B/A Aerospace, Nicholson sealing Technologies Sp. z o.o., Goodrich Krosno Sp. z o.o., 4 Air Airlines, Vac Aero, Zakład Narzędziowy w Świdniku, Royal Star Sp. z o.o. Kreisler Polska Sp. z o.o., FLY Polska Sp. z o.o., Thoni Alutec Sp. z o.o., JPB Système. PZL - Świdnik a Leonardo Helicopters Company

A lot of above mentioned enterprises located their manufactures in the area of the Podkarpackie Science and Technology Park „Aeropolis” that offers fully developed investment areas and premises of Academic Preincubator in the neighbourhood of Rzeszów-Jasionka Airport and in Special Economic Zone Euro-Park Mielec offering brownfield land and greenfield land as well as tax rebates for investors.
