= Aerospace Valley =

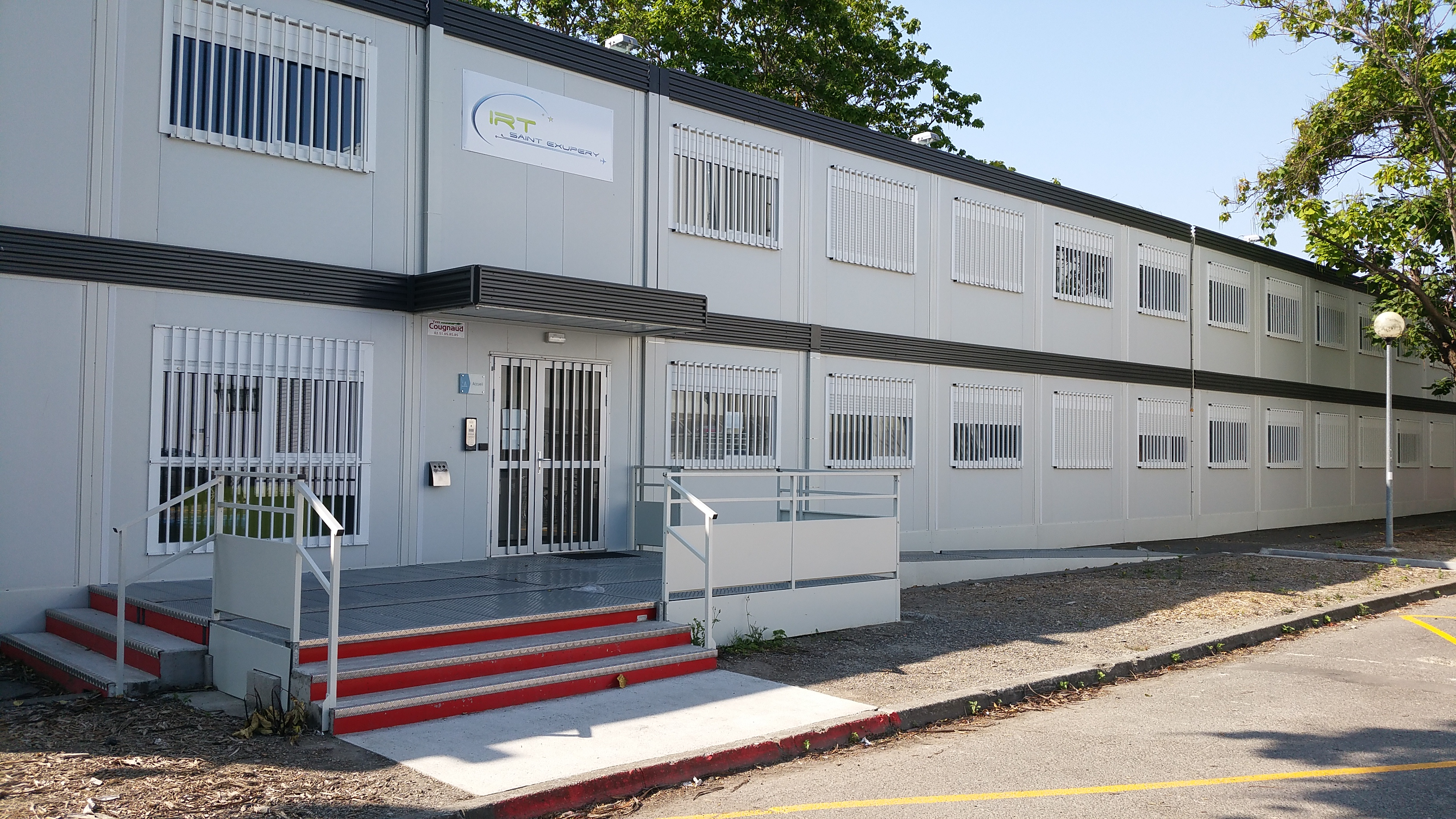
- Aerospace Valley headquarters

- Location within France Location within Occitanie
- Coordinates: 43.5633269°N 1.4881795°E
- Country: France
- Region: Occitanie
- Communes: Toulouse
- Postal code: 31400 (Toulouse)
- Website: aerospace-valley.com

Aerospace Valley is a French cluster of aerospace engineering companies and research centres. The cluster is located in the regions of Occitanie and Nouvelle-Aquitaine in the southwest of France and is mainly concentrated in and around the cities of Bordeaux and Toulouse.

As of 2009, over 500 affiliated companies (including Airbus, Air France Industries and Dassault Aviation) are responsible for some 120,000 jobs in the aviation and space flight industries. In addition, some 8,500 researchers are active within the affiliated companies and institutions.

The cluster's stated aim in 2009 was to create 40,000 - 45,000 new jobs by 2026.

The headquarters of Aerospace Valley is located in Toulouse. Chair of the cluster is Jean-Marc Thomas, who is also vicechair of Airbus France. Key locations of the cluster include:

- "Toulouse Aerospace" in Toulouse with the aviation schools ISAE (a merger of SUPAERO and ENSICA), ENAC and IPSA and over 1000 researchers at ONERA, CNRS, and CNES, among others. The Université Paul Sabatier, INSA Toulouse, INPT, and TBS Education are also part of this concentration of research and training facilities in and around Toulouse.
- A new aerospace research laboratory of the INRIA in Bordeaux
- A research centre adjacent to Turbomeca in Bordes for aerospace fuel research
- An experimental centre in Tarbes to study better ways of dismantling civil and military aircraft.

Aerospace Valley is a member of the European Aviation Clusters Partnership and of Institut au service du spatial, de ses applications et technologies.

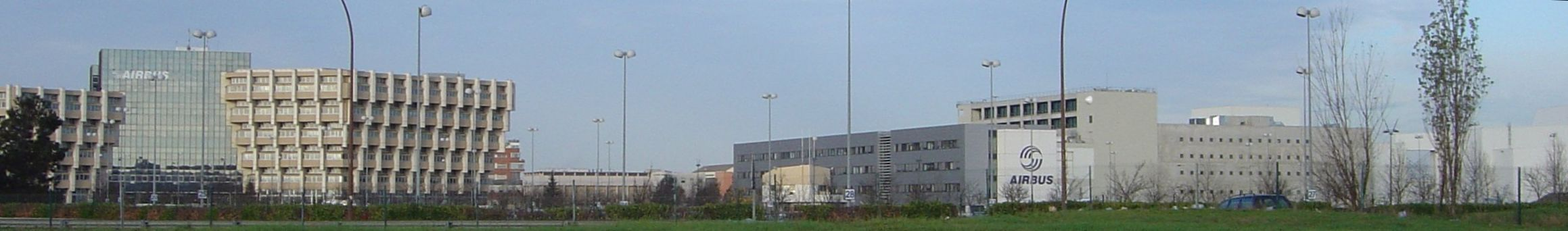
Airbus plant in Toulouse

== See also ==
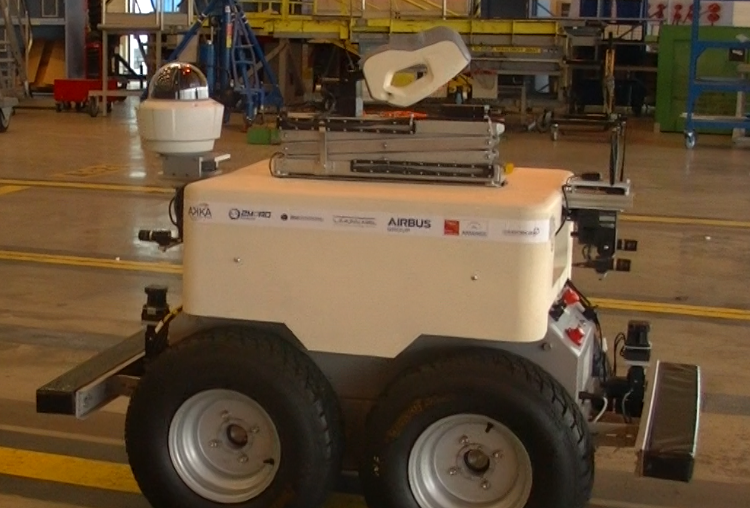
Air-Cobot is an Aerospace Valley project with the purpose to develop a collaborative mobile robot to inspect aircraft during maintenance.

- Air-Cobot, project of the Aerospace Valley cluster
- French space program
