= Diehl Aerospace =

German aerospace company

- Industry: Aerospace
- Predecessor: Diehl Avionik Systeme GmbH and Diehl Luftfahrt Electronik
- Headquarters: Überlingen, Germany
- Area served: Worldwide
- Parent: Diehl Group and Thales Group

Diehl Aerospace GmbH is an interiors and avionics specialist. Headquartered in Überlingen, Germany, the company is organised as a joint venture between the German Diehl Group and the French Thales Group.

Diehl Aerospace was founded in 2006 via the merger of Diehl Avionik Systeme GmbH and Diehl Luftfahrt Electronik. By 2013, products produced by Diehl Aerospace were reportedly integrated upon all Airbus-built airliners, as well as most Boeing-built counterparts as well. The company's growth strategy has been largely organic, but several acquisitions have been selectively made as well. The 2010s saw a significant growth in revenue, Diehl reportedly derives 50 percent of its turnover from its aviation activities, up from only 10 percent during the previous decade. In 2018, the holding group for the firm was rebranded as Diehl Aviation.

== History ==
In 2006, Diehl Aerospace was created from the merger of Diehl's previously-separate avionics and electronics divisions. As a part of this restructuring, Thales Group converted its 49 percent stake in Diehl Avionik Systeme into an equivalent share of the newly created Diehl Aerospace. Within two years, the new entity had entered the top 100 largest aerospace companies in the world, largely through its work as a supplier to the multinational aerospace conglomerate Airbus. Diehl's relationship with Airbus reaches back to the 1970s, having provided cabin lighting systems for the Airbus A300 airliner. During the 1980s, it designed the Airbus A320's flight control unit, which was subsequently adapted for both the A330 and A340 airliners as well. In 2002, it was contracted to supply the slides management system and slat flap control computer for the Airbus A380 as well, as well as to jointly produce its flight control unit in cooperation with Thales.

Outside of the European market, Diehl has secured work with various overseas aerospace companies, including Boeing, Bombardier Aerospace, and Embraer, amongst other customers. A major source of work for the company in the civilian sector has been the fitting-out of cabin interiors. Diehl has made moves to expand its presence within the interiors sector. By 2008, it was operating from five key locations across Germany. During 2011, Diehl opened a new component production plant in Hungary, its first manufacturing facility outside of Germany.

The company has also been active within the military sector; Diehl has supplied elements of both the NHIndustries NH90 helicopter and Eurofighter Typhoon multirole fighter aircraft. By 2013, Diehl was reportedly keen to expand its aerospace work in light of declining activity in the defense sector. In response to market conditions, Claus Gunther, chief executive of Diehl Defence, stated that staff were being retrained in response to shifts in demand.

In early 2012, aerospace periodical Flight International reported that the company was well-positioned to handle scheduled ramp-ups in output by both Boeing and Airbus alike. Around the same time, Diehl's chief executive, Rainer von Borstel, ruled out any further acquisitions for the time being, instead focusing upon integrating already-acquired assets, such as the lavatory manufacturer Dasell and galley manufacturer Muhlenberg Interiors, into the group. However, the interior equipment specialist AOA was acquired by the firm during the following year; Diehl subsequently reiterated that its main focus was on organic growth opportunities rather than via further acquisitions, but would be encouraging second- and third-tier suppliers to consolidate wherever possible.

By 2013, Diehl Aerospace was claiming that its products had been integrated into every airliner in production by Airbus, along with the majority of Boeing's airliners as well; it was reportedly producing components for 120 individual aircraft each month. In mid-2016, the company was again readying itself for another production ramp-up by Airbus; Diehl was described by Flight International as holding an influential position over the Airbus A350 XWB program in particular due to its interiors work.

During 2018, Diehl's aerospace assets were restructured; Diehl Aerosystems was rebranded as Diehl Aviation; this entity acts as the umbrella group for its other aerospace interests, including Diehl Aerospace, Diehl Aircabin, Diehl Comfort Modules and Gauting. By 2019, Diehl was reportedly deriving 50 percent of its turnover from its aviation activities, up from only 10 percent just a decade beforehand. The company stated that it planned to remain heavily engaged in the sector and to make further investments in its aviation business.

== See also ==
- Diehl Defence
