= Air & Cosmos =

French-language aerospace industry magazine

- Editor: Yann Cochennec
- Categories: Aerospace
- Frequency: Weekly
- Circulation: 20,450
- Publisher: Hubert de Caslou
- Founded: 1963
- Company: Discom
- Country: France
- Based in: Paris
- Language: Metropolitan French
- Website: air-cosmos.com
- ISSN: 1240-3113

Air & Cosmos is a French-language weekly industry magazine that covers the aerospace sector. The first issue was published on 25 March 1963. As of 2013, the magazine is the leading industry magazine in the French language; and one of the top three industry magazines, the other two being English-language publications Aviation Week & Space Technology and Flight International. The magazine is owned by Discom, who bought it in 2013.

== History ==
In 1963, many contributors from Les Ailes (English: "Wings"; published: 1921–1963) were also published in Air & Cosmos. The founding publisher Eugène Bollard stated that the magazine would cover aviation fans, aviation advocacy, commercial aviation, aeronautic sector, astronautic sector, military aviation, general aviation, and youth interest. The founding editor, Jean-Marie Riche, had been assistant editor at Les Ailes. The first assistant editor, Roland Desbarbieux, had been assistant editor at L'Air et l'Espace (English: "Air and Space"). .

At the end of the 1980s, Revenu Multimedia of Robert Monteux, bought the magazine.

In 2013, Revenu Multimedia sold the magazine to Discom of Hubert de Caslou.

Since the Russian invasion of Ukraine, the digital head of redaction, Xavier Tytelman is known for his analysis about the conflict. The defence consultant is as such invited to numerous French media channels for his expertise, notably his use of OSINT data. He can be described as pro-Ukrainian as he funded paramilitary equipment for French volunteers of the Ukrainian International Legion with donations made by his YouTube channel.

== Air & Cosmos International ==
Air & Cosmos International is an English language website published by Air & Cosmos and derived from the French-language magazine's content.
