= Aviso =

Ship type

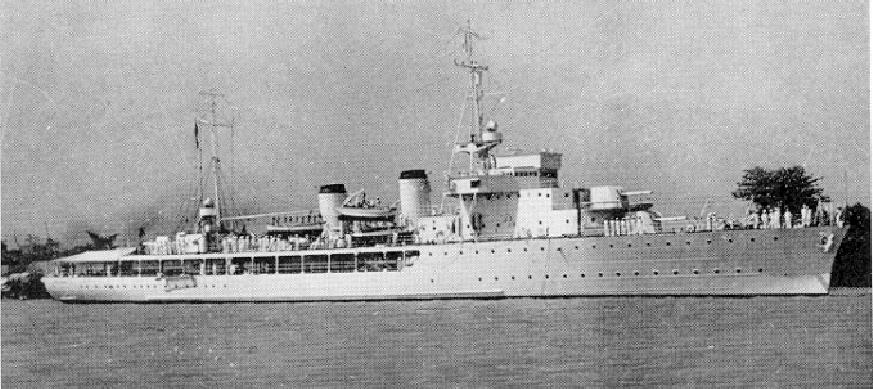
A French aviso colonial of the Bougainville class

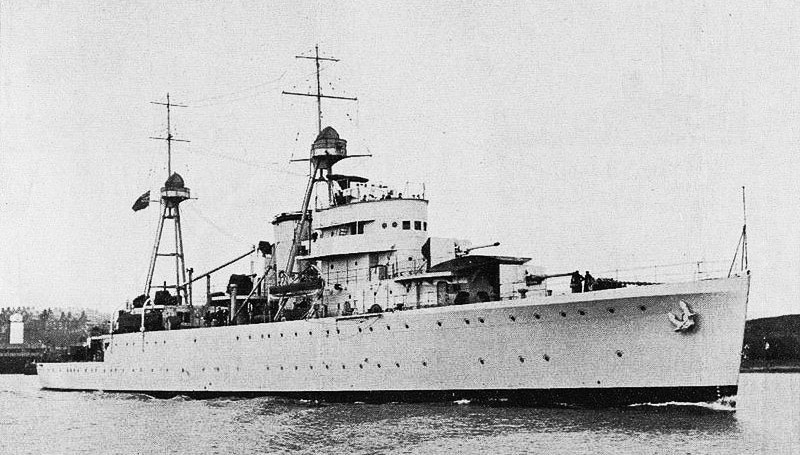
The Portuguese aviso NRP Afonso de Albuquerque, in 1935

An aviso was originally a kind of dispatch boat or "advice boat", carrying orders before the development of effective remote communication.

The term, derived from the Portuguese and Spanish word for "advice", "notice" or "warning", an aviso, was later adopted by the French and Portuguese navies to classify their medium-sized warships designed for colonial service. The term continued to be used in the French Navy to classify the D'Estienne d'Orves-class patrol frigates until 2012, when the remaining ships of the class were reclassified as offshore patrol ships. It is equivalent to the modern use of "sloop" in other countries.

== Description ==
The Dictionnaire de la Marine Française 1788–1792 (by Nicolas-Charles Romme) describes avisos as "small boats designed to carry orders or dispatches". By the late 19th century, an aviso could be of several hundred tons displacement. Usually very lightly armed and often not significantly faster than battleships or cruisers, the aviso was not intended to face enemy warships, and this meant that paddle-wheel propulsion was still viable for them.

Avisos remained a useful element of communications at sea into the start of the twentieth century. The advent of wireless telegraphy changed this, however; avisos became obsolete as dispatch-carrying vessels with the continued development and improvement of this means of immediately communicating detailed information at a distance. As a result, in the early years of the 20th century, the type was instead optimised for the colonial defence and escort roles.

French avisos used during World War I and World War II had displacements of 300–700 tons, speeds of 13–20 knots (24–37 km/h; 15–23 mph), and main armaments usually of two 100 mm (3.9 in) guns, four 100 mm (3.9 in) guns, or two 138 mm (5.4 in) guns. Colonial avisos, such as the Bougainville class, intended for overseas service, were larger.

The Portuguese Navy used avisos to operate in the waters of the Portuguese Empire. The Portuguese built the first-rate Afonso de Albuquerque class of 1,780 tons and the second-rate (Gonçalo Velho and Pedro Nunes classes of 950 to 1,090 tons).

In some navies the term is now used to include combat-capable ships larger than patrol boats, but smaller than corvettes. They typically have roles in anti-submarine warfare and coastal defence. For example, the Italian Orsa-class anti-submarine escort destroyers of WWII were rated for a time as aviso scorta or 'escort aviso'. In NATO classification avisos of ASW type usually are recognized as corvettes.

The Argentine Navy has several ships classified as avisos. ARA Alferez Sobral, an 800-ton vessel used for non-combat tasks, built as a United States Navy fleet tug, was attacked and damaged during the 1982 Falklands War.

=== Civilian avisos: French Aéropostale transatlantic service ===
During the interwar period air mail service and commercial airlines boomed and French industrialist Pierre-Georges Latécoère founded the famed Aéropostale line between Paris and South America via Toulouse, Morocco, Mauretania, Senegal, Brazil Argentina and Chile. Aéropostale employed pioneering pilots such as Henri Guillaumet, Paul Codos, Antoine de Saint-Exupéry and Jean Mermoz. Period aircraft (war surplus Breguets and purpose-built Latécoères) were initially too short-ranged to undertake the Atlantic crossing between Saint Louis du Senegal and Rio de Janeiro. Similar problems existed for the German Lufthansa on the same run, but while Lufthansa opted for a stationary, flying boat tender, the Westfalen, with catapult and lifting crane in the middle of the Atlantic to extend the range of their Dornier flying boats, Aéropostale initially relied on avisos to carry the mail on the transatlantic stretch of the Aéropostale line. Initially Aéropostale leased Arras-class avisos, on loan from the French Marine Nationale, a class of dual purpose semi-commercial ships intended for Q-ship service.

These coal fired ships proved to be both expensive to operate and quite worn out by wartime service. Aéropostale ordered four purely civilian diesel-powered avisos from civilian shipyards in Bordeaux and Nantes, equipped with 1700 hp diesel engines and a cruising speed of 16 knots and returned the Arras-class avisos to the French navy. These ships plugged the gap until long range seaplanes such as the Latécoère 28, became available. After the groundbreaking transatlantic commercial mailflights pioneered by Jean Mermoz the Aéropostale mail line went entirely airborne and cut the mail delivery time from Paris to Rio de Janeiro from 20 days to just three.

== See also ==
- Dolphin, Erie and Charleston – U.S. Navy gunboats similar to colonial sloops
- Flores-class gunboats – Dutch colonial sloops officially rated as "Kanonneerboot" (gunboats)
- HNLMS Johan Maurits van Nassau – improved Flores-class gunboat
