= Pierre Deley =

French aviator

Pierre Deley (1 November 1893 – 27 February 1981), was one of the pioneering pilots for the Aéropostale company.

He was born in Marseillan, Hérault, the grand nephew and godson of another Marseillan native, Pierre Roques, the founder of French military aviation.

He obtained his fighter pilot's licence in 1917 and finished World War I with six aerial victories. He joined the Pierre-Georges Latécoère's Lignes Aériennes Latécoère company (later to become Aéropostale) in 1923, rubbing shoulders with, among others, Didier Daurat, Jean Mermoz, Henri Guillaumet and Antoine de Saint-Exupéry.

After Mermoz and Guillaumet, he was the third pilot to cross the Andes, eventually doing so more than 150 times. When Guillaumet disappeared in the Andes, Deley was one of the pilots who searched for him before he was eventually rescued.

He created and managed the airport at Port-Étienne, then became station chief at Santiago airport, Chile.

He was transferred to Air France in 1933 following the company's creation, and posted to Buenos Aires, becoming the company's representative for Argentina and Chile.

He died and was buried in his home town of Marseillan.

== Film ==
The 1995 IMAX film Wings of Courage (director: Jean-Jacques Annaud) traced the career of Guillaumet. The part of Pierre Deley was played by Ken Pogue.
