= Raymond Vanier =

French aviator

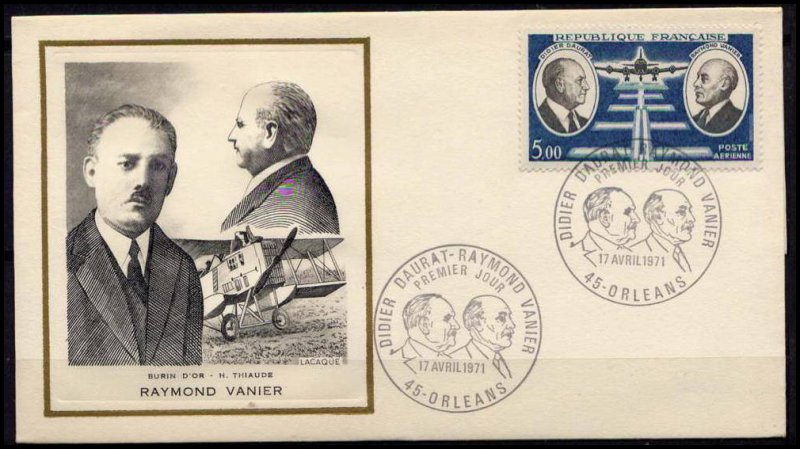
- Born: 6 August 1895; Orléans, Loiret, France
- Died: 15 August 1965 (aged 70); Paris, France
- Resting place: Cimetière Père-Lachaise, Paris
- Known for: Chief pilot of Air Bleu, 1935. First night-flying pilot of the French Postal Airlines. Head of Postal Department, Air France, 1948 - 1959.
- Awards: Croix de Guerre (Military Medal) of France with eight citations Commandeur de la Légion d’Honneur
- Aviation career
- Famous flights: Natal to Rio De Janeiro - pioneering night flight in tropical storms, May 1930
- Air force: Aéronautique Militaire France World War I
- Rank: Sous-Lieutenant

Raymond Lucien Vanier (6 August 1895 – 15 August 1965) was a pioneering French aviator. Vanier played a key role in the development of French and Spanish civil aviation, despite being less well-known to the general public than Jean Mermoz, Henri Guillaumet or Antoine de Saint-Exupéry.

== Career ==
Vanier was born in Orléans. During the First World War, he began as an NCO in the artillery before transferring to become a fighter pilot on 15 March 1917. He gained a strong reputation and was highly decorated. After the end of the war, in 1919, Vanier was hired as a pilot for the newly developing airline of Pierre-Georges Latécoère, Aéropostale, which was based in Toulouse. He became its station manager in Málaga, and then in Barcelona. In the same year, he opened up Spanish routes, and beginning in 1927 set up connections to South America.

On 30 August 1933, Air France was created when Aéropostale merged with Air Orient, Air Union, Compagnie Internationale de Navigation Aérienne (CIDNA), and Société Générale des Transports Aériens (SGTA). Vanier's first task for the new airline was to determine an appropriate location in Cape Verde for a new airfield, which would serve as an emergency landing location for the Company's aircraft flying the Dakar-Natal route. In 1934, he determined that a plot of land in Praia, Santiago, would be most appropriate. The current international airport is only a few hundred metres away from the original site chosen by Vanier.

In 1935, Vanier was appointed the chief pilot of Air Bleu. In 1939, he piloted the first night-time postal flights for the airline, until they were shut down by World War II. In 1945, he was integral to restarting these flights, this time for Air France. In 1948, Vanier was appointed head of the postal department of Air France. He worked there until his retirement in February 1959.

Vanier broke the record for emergency landings, saving a number of his comrades. He is mentioned with humour in a biography of Saint-Exupéry, arriving at the scene of one of the latter’s many crashes. Routes he instigated have continued to operate in Spain, Morocco, the Sahara, and throughout South America.

Vanier was named a Knight of the French Legion of Honour in September 1923, an Officer in March 1935 and a Commander in July 1952. He is buried in Division 3 of the Père-Lachaise cemetery in Paris.

== Founder of Barcelona International Airport ==
On 25 December 1918, Latécoère took off from Toulouse - Montaudran and arrived after a 2h 20min flight in Barcelona, landing on the Can Tunis racetrack, used since 1910 for air shows. After this flight, Latécoère outlined the need for Barcelona to have adequate facilities to receive and refuel Aéropostale aircraft. The Volateria airfield, located in the town of El Prat de Llobregat, was initially chosen. It had been used since 1916 by the Pujol Comabella Hereter School of Aviation and included the school’s workshops. On 7 January 1919, Beppo de Massimi signed a cooperation agreement with the workshops at Hereter. But in December 1919, following a disagreement over the financial conditions of using Volateria, Raymond Vanier, then Chief of Aerodromes for Latécoère, was charged with finding another suitable location nearby.

In March 1920, a new location was chosen. 800 metres long, it was on a floodplain, in very poor condition and lacking facilities. It was drained and flattened, then gradually equipped with workshops, hangars, telephone and radio telegraph. Later, night-time lighting was installed and in 1932 a passenger terminal was opened. Known as "El Frances Camp", it in turn bore the names in Spanish "Aerodromo Latécoère", "Aerodromo of Aeropostale," then "Aerodromo Air France." The land that made up the original site is now fully covered by the Barcelona International Airport.

== Night-time postal flights (La Postale de nuit) ==
As chief pilot of Air Bleu, Vanier was the pilot of the first French night-time postal service flight, which took place on 10 May 1939, using a two-engine Caudron Goéland. The flight left Paris in the afternoon and featured stop-overs in Bordeaux and Mont de Marsan before arriving at the final destination of Pau the following morning. However, the initial success of the night-time postal flights was cut short, as the German military banned night flights in France after the Franco-German Armistice of 22 June 1940.

After the end of World War II, Air France was charged with reinstating night-time postal flights. Vanier worked alongside Didier Daurat, who was the first Director of the new domestic airmail department within Air France, the Centre d’exploitation postal métropolitain (CEPM), to restart services. On 26 October 1945, the Paris-Bordeaux-Mont de Marsan-Pau night-time postal route was reinstated, followed on 2 July 1946 by a Paris-Lyon-Marseille-Nice service.

"Our crews are the only ones in the world to take off every night, whatever the weather, and whatever the visibility. On occasions where others give up, the men of the Postale carry out their unsung tasks and nothing can stop their daily rounds." - Raymond Vanier

== Autobiography “Tout pour la ligne” ==
The summary published in the 2006 re-edition of Vanier’s autobiography is as follows: ″Many books have been devoted to the pioneering of aviation in France. Often these are written a posteriori by researchers, journalists or novelists, exalting their heroic exploits. “Tout pour la ligne” on the other hand, was written by a pioneer himself. According to his personal notes, Raymond Vanier speaks directly with modesty and rigor of his working day life of more than forty years. He describes the history of the establishment of regular and reliable commercial airlines. His book is written in a spare style making us re-live the story with simplicity and passion.″

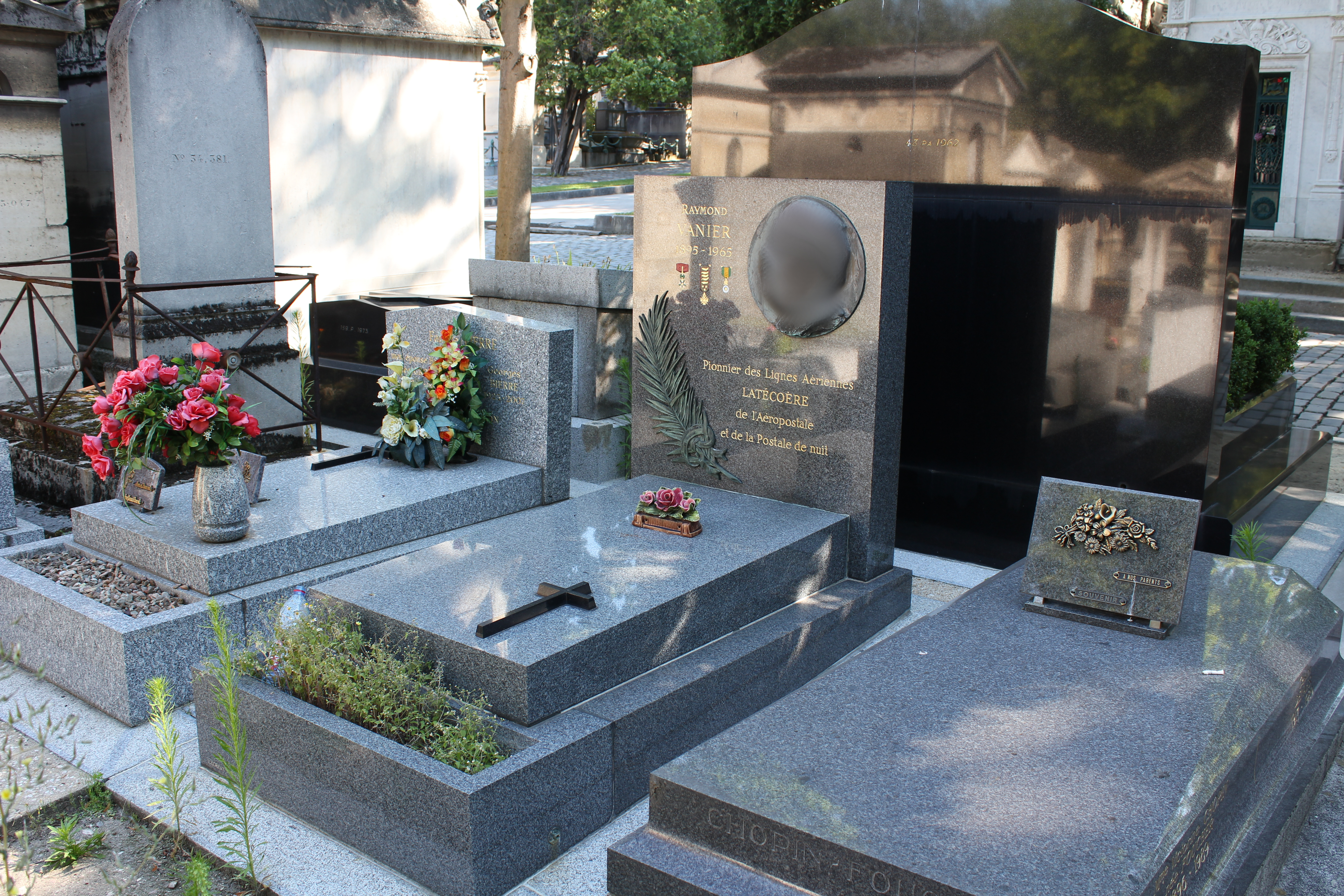
Vanier's tomb in Père-Lachaise - Division 3, portrays a bas relief of his portrait and his awards.
