= Aeroposta Argentina =

Aeroposta Argentina S. A.

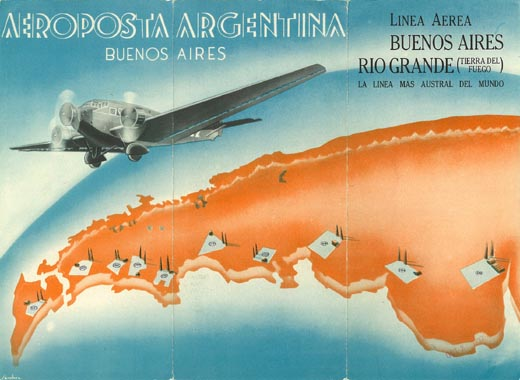
- The cover art of an Aeroposta Argentina schedule brochure, featuring a Ju 52/3m, with the motto "The southernmost line of the world".
IATA	ICAO	Call sign
AR	ARG	ARGENTINA
- Founded: September 15, 1927; 99 years ago
- Hubs: Aeroparque Jorge Newbery
- Secondary hubs: Piloto Civil Norberto Fernández International Airport; General Enrique Mosconi International Airport
- Fleet size: 19
- Destinations: 46
- Parent company: Aéropostale
- Headquarters: Buenos Aires, Argentina

This article contains machine-translated text from the Spanish Wikipedia article Aeroposta Argentina S.A. You can help by improving this Spanish to English translation.

Aeroposta Argentina S.A. was an Argentine airline established on 5 September 1927 as a subsidiary of the French airmail carrier Aéropostale(Compagnie générale aéropostale). In 1929, Aéropostale expanded its airmail network within South America, including the first domestic air services on routes to Asunción, Paraguay, Santiago de Chile, and the Argentine cities of Bahía Blanca, Comodoro Rivadavia and Río Gallegos.

The task of opening the new air routes was assigned, among others, to the French aviators Antoine de Saint-Exupéry and Jean Mermoz. Saint-Exupéry served as director of the newly formed company based in Buenos Aires, while Mermoz was appointed chief pilot. Saint-Exupéry conducted Aeroposta's inaugural flight on 1 November 1929, from the airfield at Villa Harding Green to Comodoro Rivadavia.

In the early years of commercial aviation, airline personnel surveyed routes and locations for potential emergency landing strips and fuel depots. Saint-Exupéry's experiences in Argentina later informed his novel Night Flight, which received the Prix Femina and was adapted into a film of the same name. Regular flights commenced in 1929 to additional Argentine cities, including Posadas and Mendoza. Service was further expanded the following year to Comodoro Rivadavia and San Antonio Oeste, followed shortly by Río Gallegos.

Aeroposta Argentina remained the only airline operating in Argentina until 1946, when several additional carriers were established. In 1949, Aeroposta Argentina merged with ALFA(Sociedad Mixta Aviación del Litoral Fluvial Argentino), FAMA (Flota Aérea Mercante Argentina) and ZONDA (Zonas Oeste y Norte de Aerolíneas Argentinas) to form the new national airline, Aerolíneas Argentinas.

== Parent company: Lignes Aériennes Latécoère ==
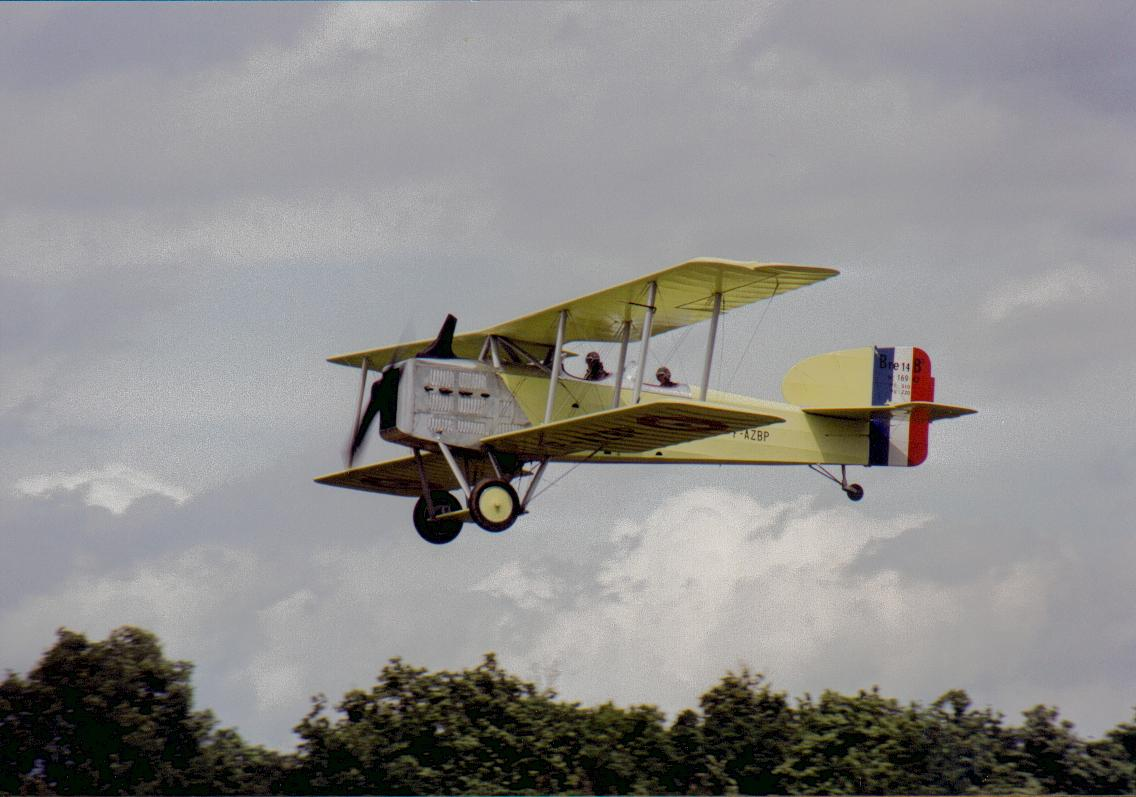
A Breguet 14 aircraft used on the Casablanca–Dakar route.

The airline Lignes Aériennes Latécoère was founded in the aftermath of World War I and established in September 1919. Its first scheduled postal route operated between Toulouse and Morocco, with stops in Barcelona and Alicante along the eastern coast of Spain. Around the same period, its founder Pierre-Georges Latécoère created the Compagnie générale d'entreprise aéronautique, and in May 1922 he established the Société industrielle des avions Latécoère.

To extend the line between Casablanca and Dakar, Captain Joseph Roig departed on 3 May 1923 with a group of three Bréguet XIV biplanes. The aircraft flew between Agadir, Cap Juby, Villa Cisneros and Port-Étienne on the west coast of Africa, arriving at their destination on 22 May.

According to a plan conceived during World War I by Pierre-Georges Latécoère, Captain Joseph Roig was sent to South America in May 1924 to examine the possibility of extending the route between Natal, Brazil, and Buenos Aires. In Buenos Aires, Roig met with officials of the Department of Civil Aviation of the War Office and stated that the directors of the Compagnie générale d'entreprises aéronautiques (CGEA) intended Buenos Aires to serve as the terminus of a future South American airmail route between the continent and France, and subsequently as a hub for airmail between Argentina and neighboring countries.

President Marcelo Torcuato de Alvear approved the proposal and authorized the company to send a civil aviation mission. Captain Joseph Roig and a group operating three Bréguet XIV Renault biplanes conducted a reconnaissance flight from Rio de Janeiro to Buenos Aires, landing at El Palomar on 14 January 1925, accompanied by pilots Paul Vachet, Étienne Lafay and Victor Hamm, and mechanics Gauthier, Estival and Chevalier. In March 1925, under unfavorable weather conditions, the group began the return journey while carrying out aerial surveys between Rio de Janeiro and Pernambuco (Recife), which were intended to support future operations on the Atlantic route. In June 1925, regular airmail service was established between Toulouse, Casablanca and Dakar.

To raise the capital required for development of the South American route, Pierre-Georges Latécoère travelled to Rio de Janeiro on 3 December 1926 to meet French businessman Marcel-Lafont Bouilloux, who was residing in Brazil. In January 1927, Latécoère, accompanied by Argentine aviator Vincent Almandos Almonacid, met President Marcelo Torcuato de Alvear in Buenos Aires to request the prompt submission of a contract that would authorize the proposed airmail service between Argentina and France.

Acting as representative and trustee of the Compagnie générale d'entreprises aéronautiques, Vicente Almandos Almonacid signed an agreement on 8 February 1927 with the director general of Posts and Telegraphs, Arturo Goyeneche, establishing a framework for the transport of mail by air within Argentina and to neighbouring countries. The agreement was ratified by a decree of the national executive on 10 June 1927, signed by President Marcelo Torcuato de Alvear and the minister of the interior, José P. Tamborini. Meanwhile, negotiations between Pierre-Georges Latécoère and Marcel Bouilloux-Lafont concluded when Bouilloux-Lafont purchased, on 11 April 1927, 93 per cent of the shares of the Compagnie générale d'entreprises aéronautiques for 30 million francs, assumed control of the company's management, and agreed to purchase Latécoère 25, 26 and 28 aircraft manufactured by the Société industrielle des avions Latécoère At a special meeting held in Paris on 12 December 1927, the company was renamed Compagnie générale aéropostale

== Birth of Aeroposta Argentina S.A. ==
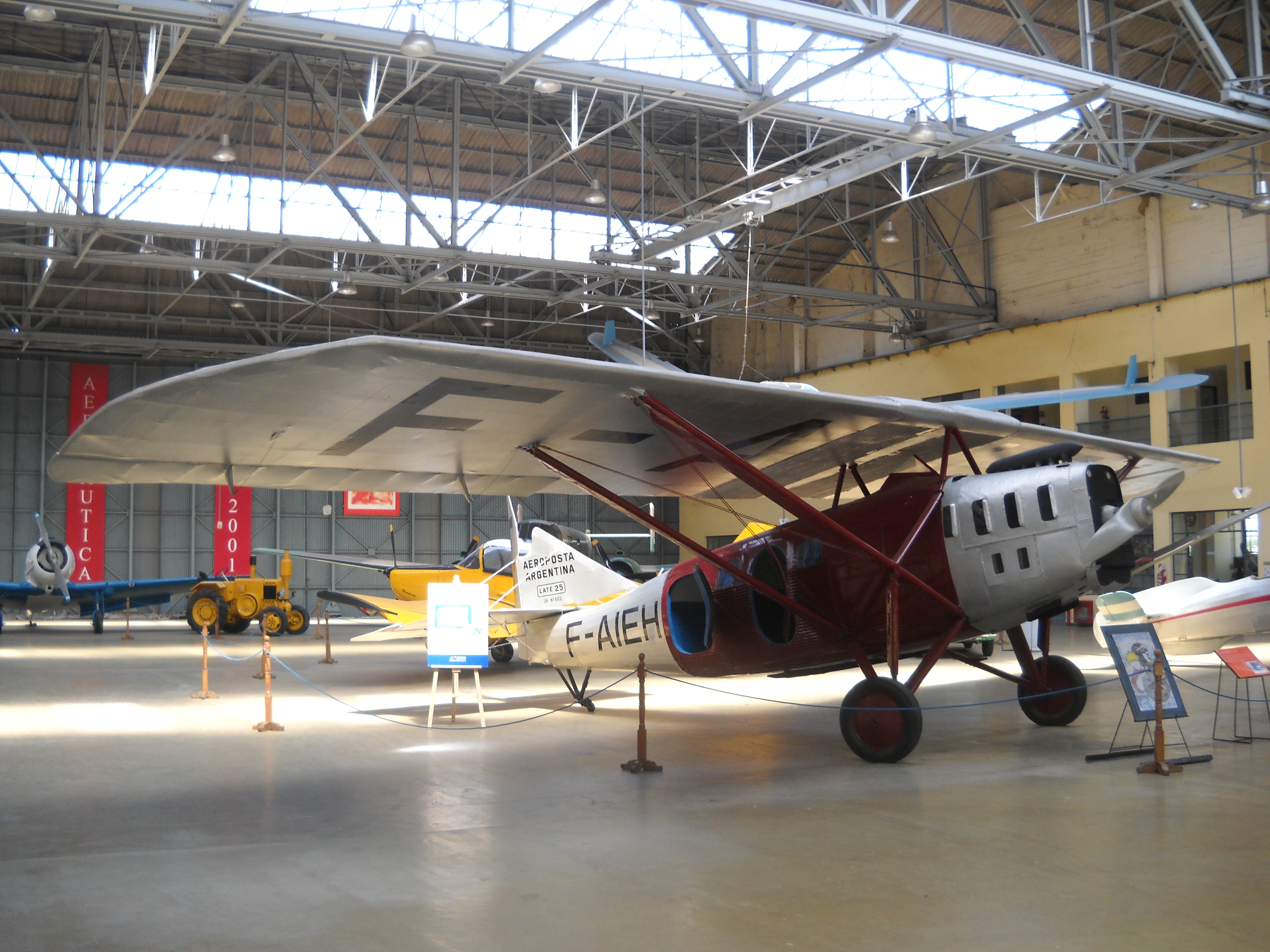
A Latécoère 25, preserved in the National Aeronautical Museum of Argentina.

On 13 August 1926, an executive order amended the Regulations for Navigation on Argentine Territory, prohibiting the use of Argentine airspace by foreign companies and assigning the War Office responsibility for defence and oversight of civil aviation. In order to comply with these regulations, Vicente Almandos Almonacid proposed the creation of a national corporation, a proposal that received the support of President Marcelo Torcuato de Alvear and several Argentine legal scholars.

The constitutive act of Aeroposta Argentina S.A., an affiliate of Compagnie générale aéropostale, was signed on 5 September 1927. The company was established with its headquarters at Calle Reconquista 240 in Buenos Aires, and its founding signatories included Agustín Melián (on behalf of Marcel Bouilloux-Lafont), Alberto Dodero, Gaston Fouvell Lleau Rigo, Alejandro Behety Menéndez, Luis Nicol, Guillermo Padilla (head of Aeronautical Radio, Department of Civil Aviation), Raúl A. Razzio, Emmanuel Sieyès and Vicente Almandos Almonacid.

On 1 November 1927, Paul Georges Pivot inaugurated the Natal–Rio de Janeiro–Buenos Aires route using a Latécoère 25 registered as F-AIOZ. The route was extended on 1 March 1928, when Jean Mermoz, flying a Latécoère 25 carrying 36 bags of mail, inaugurated what was then one of the longest airmail routes, covering approximately 13,600 km from Toulouse to Dakar, with the Dakar–Buenos Aires section operated by sea between Buenos Aires and Natal until 1935. This route became known as the "Mermoz line".

After considering several locations, Almonacid selected General Pacheco, approximately 35 km from Buenos Aires, where an airfield was built in 1928. One section of the field contained three 30-metre antennas and equipment that had been used for the LPD Radio Station "General Pacheco", which was later transferred to the postal and telecommunications authorities. The station initially handled communications with other bases at a time when aircraft lacked onboard radio equipment, and later with the company's aircraft and overseas vessels.

== Buenos Aires to Asuncion, Paraguay route ==
Two exploratory flights were conducted to survey the route between Buenos Aires and Asunción, Paraguay.

- On 3 April 1928, Peter Ficarelli departed from the General Pacheco Aerodrome in Buenos Aires in a Bréguet XIV (Renault 300 hp) biplane. After a stopover at the Aeroclub Rosario, he continued over the provinces of Entre Ríos, Corrientes, Chaco and Formosa, noting existing airfields and flying clubs that could serve as potential landing sites.
- On 31 October 1928, Paul Vachet, the company's chief of traffic, departed General Pacheco Aerodrome in a Bréguet XIV biplane at 07:00 carrying copies of the newspaper La Prensa and arrived at Asunción Airport in Paraguay at 18:00, confirming the final alignment of the route between Buenos Aires and Asunción.

On 1 January 1929, Aeroposta Argentina began airmail and passenger services, operating without formal authorization. At 06:00, two Latécoère 25 (Renault 450 hp) monoplanes departed from General Pacheco Aerodrome.

- One of the aircraft, no. 619 (registration F-AIFX), was flown by Paul Vachet and Peter Ficarelli and carried as passengers Lidia Vachet, engineer Padilla (a company director), and mechanic Gutiérrez.
- The other aircraft, no. 631 (registration F-AIJZ), named "Colonel Bogado", was flown by Argentine pilot Leonardo Selvetti and carried mechanic Ferrando, passenger Di Sandro, a small quantity of mail and copies of the newspaper "La Prensa".

After a stop in Corrientes, both aircraft landed at the military airport of Campo Grande, Paraguay, where authorities and a large crowd were present. As the Argentine government had not granted the necessary authorization, the mail carried on these flights was not officially dispatched, and the journeys are regarded as trial airmail flights.

Following amendments to the Regulations on Navigation on Argentine Territory, the national government granted the necessary authorization on 27 February 1929. On 22 March 1929, at 06:00, Pedro Ficarelli departed from General Pacheco Aerodrome in a Latécoère 25, making the first official postal flight from Argentina.

Pedro Ficarelli was killed near Asunción, Paraguay, on 16 August 1929, when the Latécoère 25 no. 619 (registration F-AIFX) he was flying collided with a mountain in dense fog.

== Buenos Aires – Mendoza – Santiago de Chile route ==
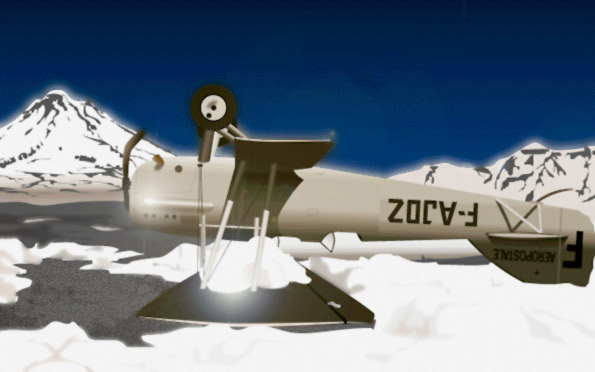
Henri Guillaumet's crashed Potez 25, F-AJDZ, on the frozen surface of Laguna del Diamante in the Andes.

To identify routes for crossing the Andes, which extend along much of South America, Jean Mermoz and his mechanic Alexandre Collenot undertook test flights between Buenos Aires and Santiago de Chile. These flights began on 19 November 1928 and continued until 9 March 1929. Operating a Latécoère 25 (no. 603, registration F-AIEH), they flew westward via Mendoza. During one flight, they made an emergency landing on a narrow mountain ledge and, after adjusting the engine carburettor, were able to take off and reach Copiapó, Chile.

The experience led them to conclude that the Potez 25 was better suited to the airmail route between Argentina and Chile across the Andes because of its climb performance, which was necessary for high-altitude operations. Five aircraft were acquired and registered as F-AJDX (no. 1520), F-AJDY (no. 1521), F-AIDZ (no. 1522), F-AJZR (no. 2035) and F-AJZS (no. 2036).

On 14 July 1929, Jean Mermoz and Henri Guillaumet conducted the first airmail flight from Santiago de Chile to Mendoza in a Potez 25. On 13 June 1930, Guillaumet crashed a Potez 25 (registration F-AJDZ) on the frozen surface of Laguna del Diamante. He was found on 20 June by 14-year-old Juan García after walking out of the Andes. García was later awarded the Legion of Honour for his role in the rescue. This period of Aeroposta Argentina's history is depicted in Wings of Courage, an IMAX film by French director Jean-Jacques Annaud.

== Buenos Aires – Bahía Blanca – Comodoro Rivadavia route ==
Latécoère 28

In September 1928, pilot-mechanic Pedro Ficarelli and Alfredo Vitolo conducted the first reconnaissance flight to Comodoro Rivadavia in a Latécoère 25, using the facilities of the Bahía Blanca Aeroclub at the site known as "La Mendoza". In February 1929, Paul Vachet continued the exploratory flights and initiated construction of infrastructure at the planned intermediate stops.

Between 29 October and 1 November 1929, final inspection flights were carried out by the company's director Antoine de Saint-Exupéry, accompanied by pilot Rufino Luro Cambaceres in a Latécoère 25 (registration F-AIQF). Additional inspection flights on the same route were conducted by pilots Próspero Palazzo and Richard Gross in another Latécoère 25 (registration F-AIQL).

On 1 November 1929, the Buenos Aires–Bahía Blanca–Comodoro Rivadavia route was opened, with intermediate stops at San Antonio Oeste (now Antoine de Saint Exupéry Airport) and Trelew. The first flight on the route was operated by Antoine de Saint-Exupéry in a Latécoère 25 (registration F-AIQL), carrying as passengers the journalists Enrique Julio of *La Nueva Provincia*, Emilio J. Fence of *El Atlántico* and Augusto Hunter of *La Mañana*, and handling mail at each stop. The official inaugural flight was conducted by Jean Mermoz, accompanied by pilot Richard Gross, in a Latécoère 28 that departed in the early morning from General Pacheco Aerodrome with Captain Vicente Almandos Almonacid, director of Aeroposta Argentina, as well as officials and journalists on board.

At Bahía Blanca, responsibility for the section of the route to Comodoro Rivadavia passed to Richard Gross and Próspero Palazzo. During the first six months, the line's operating base was located in the Villa Harding Green area of Bahía Blanca, where a metal hangar, two radio masts, a weather station and an office building for passenger services were constructed. The connection between Buenos Aires and Bahía Blanca was initially made by overnight rail from Constitución station, with passengers transferring to the air service in the morning. In May 1930, operations began departing from General Pacheco Aerodrome, and Bahía Blanca subsequently became an intermediate stop on the route.

In March 1930, Mermoz completed the first transatlantic airmail flight in approximately 21 hours in a pontoon-equipped Latécoère 28, carrying 130 kg of mail. On 31 March 1930, Antoine de Saint-Exupéry, the company's director of operations, made the inaugural flight to Río Gallegos in a Latécoère 28 (registration F-AJLO, *El Pampero*). His passengers included Aeroposta chairman Marcel Bouilloux-Lafont, technical director Captain Vicente Almandos Almonacid, Viscount Jacques Delalot (director of the Havas agency), Aeropostale official Julien Pranville and journalist Enrique Gutiérrez of *La Razón*. The flight was accompanied by Rufino Luro Cambaceres in a Latécoère 25 (registration F-AIQF).

Pilots Próspero Palazzo and César Brugo were killed on 23 June 1936 at Pampa de Salamanca, approximately 60 km from Comodoro Rivadavia, when the Latécoère 28 no. 293 (registration F-AJUX) they were operating crashed.

== The National Aeroposta ==
The onset of the Great Depression severely affected Marcel Bouilloux-Lafont, whose interests included a banking consortium and transport companies. From early 1930, the French government declined to release a previously approved loan, and the company’s financial situation was further weakened by the Argentine coup of September 1930 and the revolution that brought Getúlio Vargas to power in Brazil in October of that year. Subsequent ministerial changes in France in December 1930 prevented the renewal of state-backed operating arrangements and guarantees needed to secure new loans. The Compagnie Générale Aéropostale was placed in liquidation on 31 March 1931 and was later absorbed into the group of companies that formed Air France in 1933, which continued the operations of Aéropostale and its predecessor airlines.

The situation of Aeroposta Argentina was similar, as the Argentine government also declined to provide financial support, and the company ceased operations in June 1931. Following public and press criticism, the director of postal services and the director of civil aviation advocated for the airline’s reinstatement, and the president of Argentina’s provisional government subsequently authorized Aeroposta Argentina S.A. to resume services.

By decree of 29 September 1931, the company was placed under a lease and the supervision of the Directorate General of Civil Aviation and the General Post and Telegraph for the operation of the route between Bahía Blanca and Río Gallegos on an experimental basis for a period of six months. Under this arrangement, its aircraft and facilities were leased at a cost of 7,000 pesos per month. In legal terms the company was designated "Aeroposta Nacional", although at the corporate level it continued to operate as Aeroposta Argentina S.A.

Services resumed on 2 October 1931 and continued until 31 May 1932, when a new decree extended the authorization from 1 June to 31 December 1932 and, for the first time, granted a fixed monthly subsidy and the necessary fuel, to be supplied by YPF. A further decree of 24 March 1933 established a ten-year operating agreement, increased the subsidy and provided for the possible extension of the route to Ushuaia.

In October 1933, Rufino Luro Cambaceres conducted a reconnaissance and promotional flight over Patagonia, during which he informed local authorities and residents about the use of air transport for mail and passengers. Following this flight, several communities in southern Argentina submitted requests to Buenos Aires for inclusion of their localities as stops on the route.

In early 1935, Aeroposta Argentina acquired second-hand aircraft from Air France that had previously been operated by Aéropostale, and in September 1935 it extended its services to Río Grande.

In November 1935, the company’s bylaws were amended to allow the participation of an Argentine shareholder group.

== The Pueyrredón consortium ==
In 1936, when renewed financial difficulties threatened the airline’s operations, a group of Argentine businessmen led by Ernesto Pueyrredón formed a consortium that acquired 97 per cent of the company’s shares, transferring control to domestic ownership. Following a proposal by officials of the Directorate General of Civil Aviation, Decree No. 99,184 of 1 February 1937 authorised the company to extend its services from Buenos Aires and replaced the previous cash and fuel subsidies with a monthly payment of 1.50 pesos for each mile flown.

Under the new ten-year contract, the company was required to offer a 50 per cent discount on ticket prices for personnel of the postal and telegraph services and the aeronautics directorate, subject to seat availability. It was also obliged to reserve space for up to 2 kg of official correspondence to be carried without charge and to renew its existing fleet.

In 1937, the company purchased three Junkers Ju 52/3m aircraft, registered LV-AAB (Patagonia), LV-BAB (Pampa) and LV-CAB (Tierra del Fuego), together with spare parts, BMW engines and Lorenz and Telefunken radio equipment, as part of a fleet modernisation programme. Personnel from Lufthansa and other German organisations were engaged to provide flight and maintenance training at Quilmes Aerodrome, where, in October of that year, the first regular services between Buenos Aires and Río Grande were operated with Patagonia, flown by Paul Selvetti Rohlandt and Argentine pilots Gross and Irigoyen.

In April 1938, a decree authorised Aeroposta Argentina S.A. to coordinate its national and international operations with Air France and Condor Ltda. A further decree in December 1939 modified the service frequency on the Buenos Aires–Río Gallegos and Buenos Aires–Río Grande routes.

Following pressure from the United States after its entry into the Second World War, Syndicato Condor, a Lufthansa subsidiary operating in Brazil, Bolivia and Peru, ceased operations. In this context, Aeroposta Argentina acquired two additional Junkers Ju 52 aircraft: LV-AAJ Ibaté in Brazil in April 1942 and LV-AAN Quichua in Bolivia in June 1943, bringing its Ju 52 fleet to five aircraft by June 1952.

== Competitors ==
Similar services were later provided by airlines established by the Argentine Air Force, which in the early 1940s created LASO (Línea Aérea Sudoeste) and LANE (Línea Aérea Noreste). These airlines were reorganised as Líneas Aéreas del Estado (LADE) in 1945.

In 1946, the Argentine government established mixed-ownership airlines (sociedades mixtas), including Aeroposta, ALFA (Aviación del Litoral Fluvial Argentino), ZONDA (which replaced Panagra) and FAMA (Flota Aérea Mercante Argentina), which was intended to operate intercontinental services. In 1950, new regulations prohibiting private shareholdings in air transport companies led to the merger of these airlines into the state flag carrier Aerolíneas Argentinas, with the exception of Líneas Aéreas del Estado (LADE).

== Commemoration ==
On 2 January 1979, surviving Aeroposta Argentina pilots gathered to mark the fiftieth anniversary of the airline's first flight. Those present included Virgilio Mira, Alberto Papa, H. Papa, Leonardo Selvetti, Pedro Artigau, Oscar Bujía and Martignoni, as well as Ermenilda Almandós Almonacid, daughter of the airline's founder, Vicente Almandos Almonacid.

== See also ==
- Aéropostale
- Aeropostal Alas de Venezuela
- List of defunct airlines of South America
