= Mermoz =

Mermoz - which is originally a family name from central-East France - may refer to:

== People ==
Mermoz is a surname of Arpitan origin. Like many Arpitan anthroponyms, the final -z only marks paroxytonic stress and should not be pronounced. Nevertheless, it is often pronounced in French through hypercorrection. Notable people with the surname include:

- Jean Mermoz, 1901–1936, a French aviator
- Maxime Mermoz, a French professional rugby union footballer

== Transport ==
- USS Muskegon (PF-24), a Tacoma-class frigate later commissioned in the French Navy as Mermoz (F-14)
- Serenade, a cruise ship originally named Jean Mermoz

== Other ==
- Aguja Mermoz (Mermoz Needle), a mountain in Argentina
- Mermoz (film), a 1943 French film
- Lycée Français Jean-Mermoz, a school in Buenos Aires, Argentina
- Mermoz-Sacré-Cœur, a neighbourhood of Dakar, the capital city of Senegal
- Jean Mermoz, a comic book by Jean-Michel Charlier
