= Latécoère 15 =

French airliner

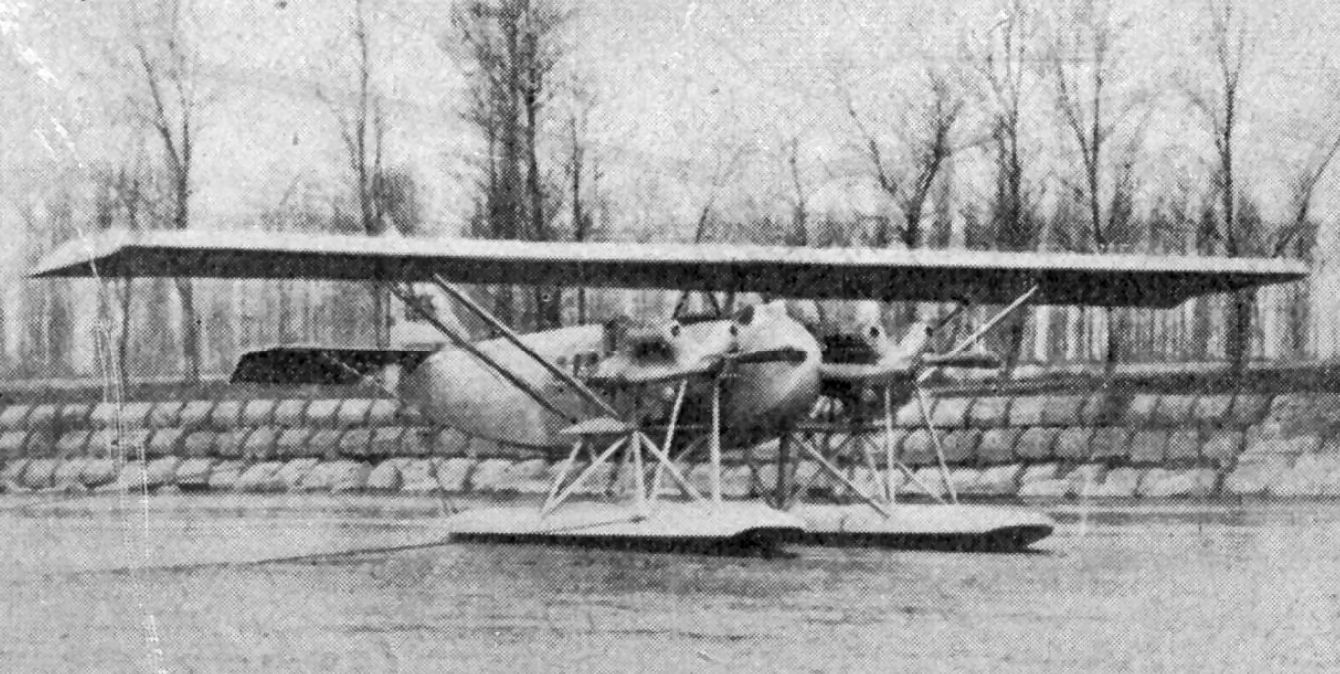
- Latécoère 15H

General information
- Type: Airliner
- National origin: France
- Manufacturer: Latécoère
- Primary user: Lignes Aériennes Latécoère
- Number built: 10

History
- First flight: February 1925

The Latécoère 15 was a French airliner built in 1925 for Latécoère's own airline, which operated routes between France and Morocco. It featured a parasol-wing monoplane design with twin engines mounted on the wing bracing struts. Small stub wings on the lower fuselage provided mounting points for the struts and main undercarriage units. The aircraft could carry six passengers in an enclosed cabin, while the pilot was situated in an open cockpit at the nose.

Despite its innovative design, the Latécoère 15 was significantly underpowered. It struggled to take off with its maximum intended load and could not maintain flight on a single engine. Initially, Pierre-Georges Latécoère intended to use the aircraft to extend the airline's route from Casablanca over the desert to Dakar. However, pilot Didier Daurat, who was assigned to this route, refused to fly the aircraft due to its performance issues. As a result, the ten Latécoère 15s produced were used on the Oran-Casablanca route and short feeder routes into Casablanca. These aircraft were withdrawn from service between 1926 and 1929.

One Latécoère 15 was converted into a seaplane variant known as the Latécoère 15H, fitted with pontoons for trial operations on a route between Alicante and Oran. However, the trials were unsuccessful, and the aircraft was subsequently converted back to its original configuration.

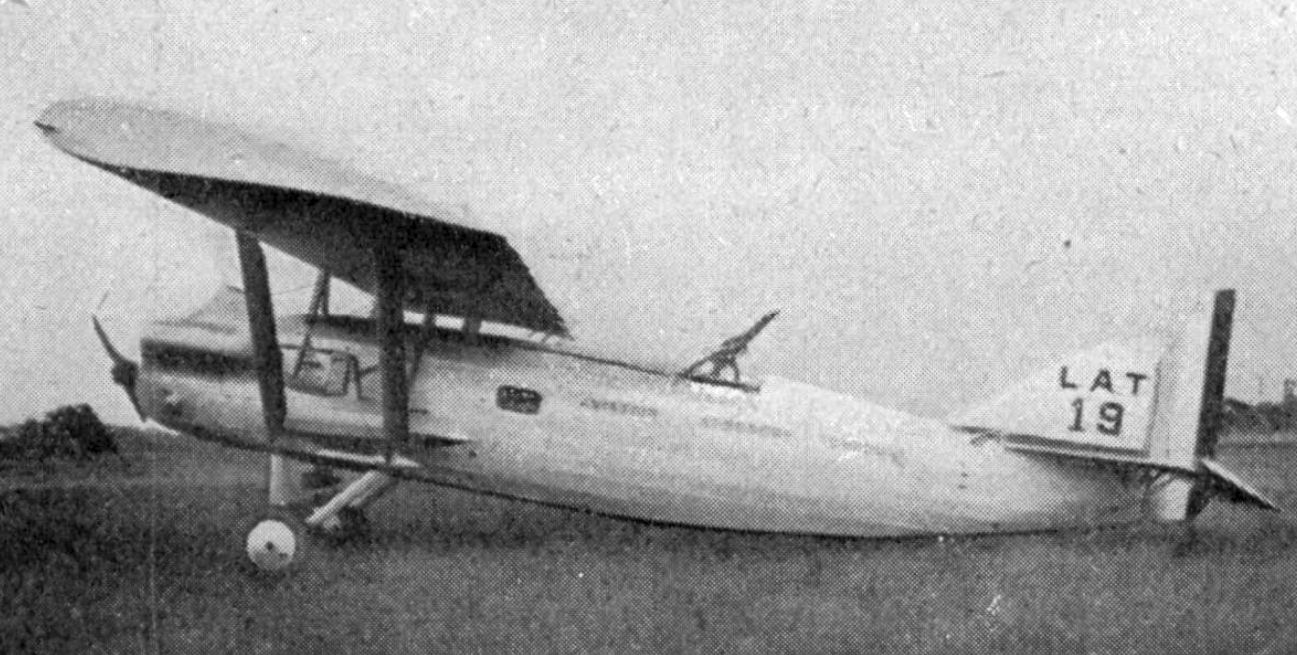
Latécoère 19 photo from L'Aéronautique January,1926

Additionally, a third prototype of the Latécoère 15 was developed as a bomber and designated the Latécoère 19. This version featured a modified fuselage but retained the basic design of the Latécoère 15. It was equipped with a fixed Vickers machine gun in the nose, an open dorsal turret with a Lewis machine gun, and another Lewis gun mounted to fire down through a ventral port. The passenger cabin was replaced with bomb racks and ventral hooks for carrying ordnance.

== Specifications ==
General characteristics

- Crew: One pilot
- Capacity: 6 passengers
- Length: 11.85 m (38 ft 11 in)
- Wingspan: 18.00 m (59 ft 1 in)
- Height: 3.82 m (12 ft 6 in)
- Wing area: 56.5 m^{2} (608 sq ft)
- Empty weight: 1,900 kg (4,190 lb)
- Gross weight: 3,530 kg (7,780 lb)
- Powerplant: 2 × Lorraine 8Bi , 194 kW (260 hp) each

Performance

- Maximum speed: 110 km/h (180 mph, 160 kn)
- Range: 600 km (380 mi, 330 nmi)
- Service ceiling: 4,500 m (14,800 ft)
