= Saint-Exupéry Airport =

Saint-Exupéry Airport may refer to:

- Lyon-Saint Exupéry Airport (French: Aéroport Lyon Saint-Exupéry), ICAO identifier LFLL, an international airport in Lyon, France
- Antoine de Saint Exupéry Airport (Argentina) (Spanish: Aeropuerto Antonie de Saint Exupery), ICAO identifier SAVN, an airport serving San Antonio Oeste, Río Negro, Argentina
- Saint-Exupery Airport, Brazil, ICAO identifier SDDK, a small community airdrome in Ocauçu, São Paulo, Brazil
