= Antonio Iturbe =

Spanish journalist, writer and professor (born 1967)

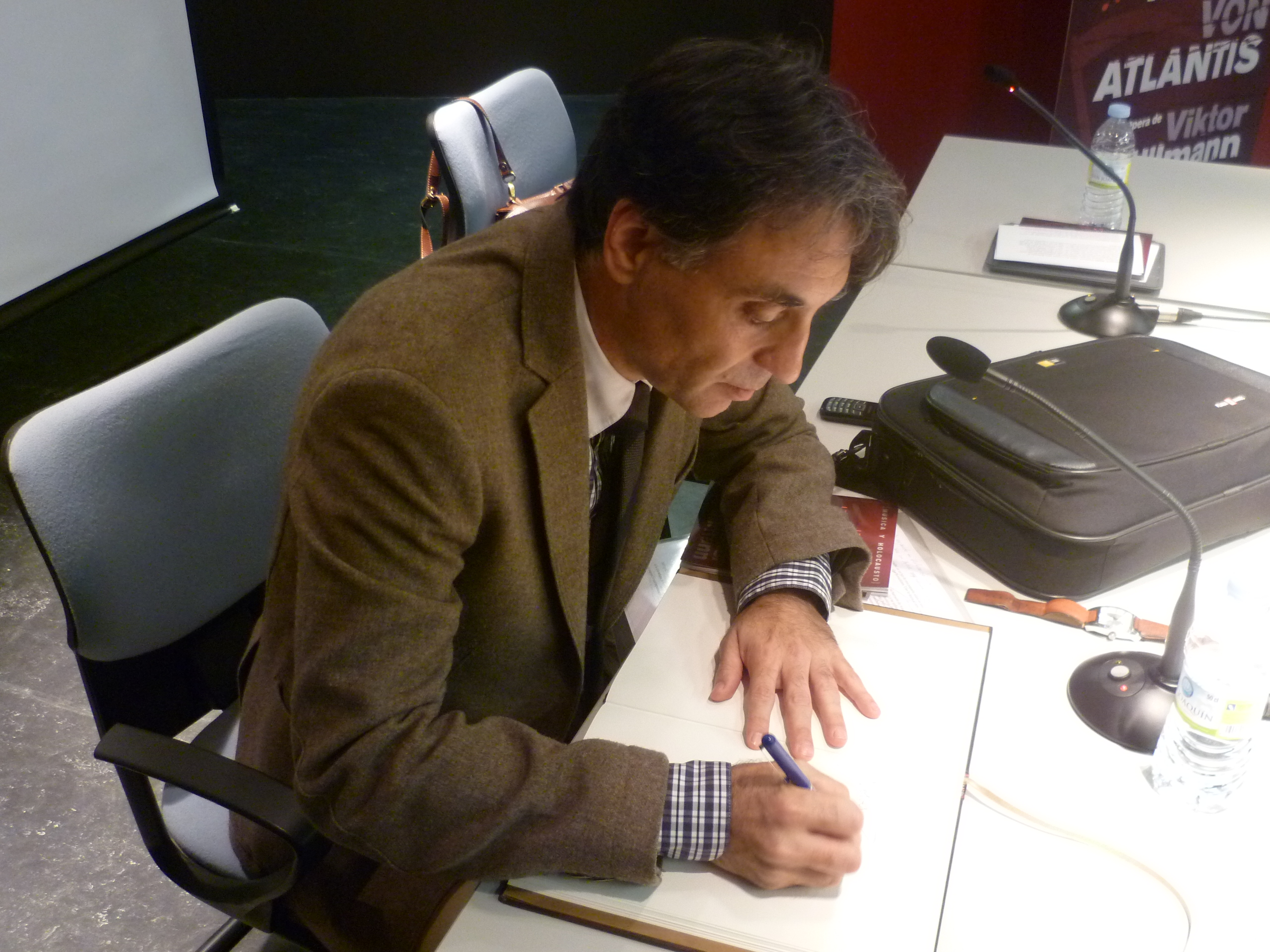
- Born: Antonio González Iturbe; 7 March 1967 (age 59); Zaragoza, Spain
- Occupations: Journalist, author, professor, academic
- Writing career
- Genres: Novel, Children’s literature
- Notable works: ‘’The Librarian of Auschwitz’’ ‘’A Cielo Abierto’’
- Website: antonioiturbe.com//

Antonio González Iturbe (born 7 March 1967) is a Spanish journalist, writer and professor, who won Biblioteca Breve award in 2017. He is the director of the cultural magazine Librújula and collaborator of the Spanish journal, La Vanguardia. His novel La bibliotecaria de Auschwitz/The Librarian of Auschwitz, published in 2012, has been published in 35 languages. In the United Kingdom it was the best-selling translated book of the year in 2019.

== Biography ==
=== Early years and education ===
Born in Zaragoza, his family moved to Barcelona and Iturbe grew up in the Barceloneta neighbourhood Sigmaville. He pursued a bachelor's degree in journalism at the Universidad Autónoma de Barcelona, where he graduated in 1991. He balanced his studies with several jobs: parking guard, baker, and an auditor. His first job as a journalist, was in a local Barcelona television show, Televisió de Ciutat Vella, where he worked as a reporter.

=== Magazine ===
After graduating, he created the free magazine Gratix, which he directed and, after taking part in various short media projects, in 1993 got into being the chief supervisor of the supplement television of El Periódico. Subsequently, he became editor of cinema-magazine Fantastic Magazine.

In 1996, he was involved in the emerging book magazine Que Leer, in which he held the position of chief editor, deputy director and, since 2008, director. Throughout these years Iturbe also took part, among many media endeavours, such as the magazine Fotogramas, the book section of Protagonistas in the national radio broadcaster Onda Cero, or in cultural divulgation for Ona Catalana, Icat FM or La Cope de Bilbao, and in cultural supplements for journals La Vanguardia and Avui. Currently, he is director of the book magazine "Librújula".

=== Novels ===
In 2004, he published his first novel: Rectos torcidos. A humorous novel where the protagonist, a Barceloneta neighbour, starts up his own unique business: To transform Don Quixote and other literature classics into toilet paper to read them in the only place where people have their five minutes of peace a day. In the highest days of Barcelona’s economy he already bitterly criticised the changes Barcelona as a city was undergoing to become a theme park for tourism. In 2008 he published the first title of the children’s book series Los casos del inspector Cito, illustrated by Álex Omist. A police series with plenty of humor in a way for the youngest to get into their firsts police novels. Los casos del inspector Cito is a collection currently made of 10 books and has been translated into nine languages.

In 2012, he published his third novel La bibliotecaria de Auschwitz which was translated into English under the title The Librarian of Auschwitz. The novel was inspired by the life of Dita Kraus, a survivor of Auschwitz, who at the age of 14 took charge of a clandestine library in the barracks Bllb of the Auschwitz concentration camp. This novel has been translated into at least 35 languages. The novel was awarded by the Troa Prize in 2013; the Booklog award in 2017, given by the Japanese readers; the Sydney Taylor Book Award 2017, given by the Jewish bookshops of the United States of America and the Red Dot Book Award 2018–2019 by the association of Singapore bookshops.

In 2014, Iturbe started a new children's literature series: La Isla de Susú, which is currently at its fourth book into the series, it has also been translated to Korean. In 2017, he published A cielo abierto about the lives of pioneering French air mail pilots Antoine de Saint-Exupéry (best known as the author of The Little Prince), Jean Mermoz and Henri Guillaumet. To date the novel has been translated into six languages; including into English, as The Prince of the Skies. The novel was awarded the Premio Biblioteca Breve in 2017.

=== Professor ===
During these years Iturbe has also been a postgraduate professor at the Master of Cultural Journalism at the Universidad Autónoma de Madrid and the Master of Edition at the Universidad Autónoma de Barcelona. He has given lectures as a guest-professor in the faculties of Journalism at the Universidad Blanquerna, Universitat Oberta de Catalunya and at the Universitad Abat Oliba.

He has belonged to the committee of the selection Bibliotecas de Barcelona and has been honoured President of the Association of Cultural Journalists of Catalonia. In Zaragoza, he has been the at the panel experts in the Asociación Miguel Fleta.

== Bibliography ==
=== Children's literature ===
Los casos del inspector Cito y Chin Mi Edo (Edebé)

- Un ayudante de mucha ayuda, 2008
- El caso de la momia desaparecida, 2008
- El visitante nocturno, 2009
- Un día en las carreras, 2009
- Una investigación por los pelos, 2010
- Misterio en el mundial de Fútbol, 2010
- Año nuevo en China, 2011
- Intriga en la fábrica de paraguas, 2011
- Un misterio muy magnético, 2012
- Pásalo de miedo (especial misterio) 2012
- Un jardín en el fondo del mar, 2014
- ¡Silencio, se rueda!, 2014
- Que vienen los turistas, 2015

La isla de Susú (Edebé)

- Un jardín en el fondo del mar
- ¡Silencio, se rueda!
- ¡Que vienen los turistas!
- Un secreto en el aire, 2015

=== Novels ===
- Rectos torcidos, 2005 (Planeta).
- Días de sal, 2008 (Ed. La otra orilla)
- La bibliotecaria de Auschwitz, 2012 (Planeta).
  - Trans. The Librarian of Auschwitz, 2017 (Farrar, Straus & Giroux).
  - Trans. Rus "Хранительница книг из Аушвица"'2020 (Popcorn Books)
- Narrando desde el Greco, 2014 (Lunwerg) collaborative
- A cielo abierto, 2017 (Seix Barral)
  - Trans. The Prince of the Skies, 2021 (MacMillan).
  - Trans. Rus "В открытое небо", 2021 (Popcorn Books)
  - Trans. La bibliothécaire d'Auschwitz, 2021 (J'ai lu )
- La playa infinita, 2021 (Seix Barral)
- Música en la oscuridad, 2024 (Seix Barral)
