= Ken Pogue =

Canadian actor

- Born: July 26, 1934; Toronto, Ontario, Canada
- Died: December 15, 2015 (aged 81); Victoria, British Columbia, Canada
- Years active: 1969-2014
- Spouse: Diana Barrington

Kenneth Pogue (July 26, 1934 – December 15, 2015) was a Canadian actor.

== Career ==
His first motion picture role in 1973 was in The Neptune Factor. Where on set he almost drowned in scuba gear.

He worked on stage at the Crest Theatre, Stratford Shakespeare Festival, St. Lawrence Centre for the Arts and Guthrie Theater in the 1960s through 1980s before moving to television and film. His other film credits include The Silent Partner (1978), Lost and Found (1979), Virus (1980), Suzanne (1980), The Grey Fox (1982), The Dead Zone (1983, as the vice president), Kane & Abel (1985), Act of Vengeance (1986), Dead of Winter (1987), Crazy Moon (1987), and The Hitman (1991), starring Chuck Norris. He was also Father Dominic in the 2006 film The Mermaid Chair.

One of his memorable roles is Gerrard in CTV's pilot of Due South in 1994. It aired on CBS in the United States. Pogue reprised his character in the Season 2 episode "Bird in the Hand" where Constable Benton Fraser (Paul Gross) is forced to choose duty or vengeance.

== Personal life ==
He was married to the actress Diana Barrington. Pogue died of cancer ten days before Christmas in 2015.

== Partial filmography ==
- The Neptune Factor (1973) - Diver Thomas
- Dangerous Relations (1973)
- Second Wind (1976) - Pete
- The Silent Partner (1978) - Detective Willard
- Lost and Found (1979) - Julian
- Every Person Is Guilty (1979)
- An American Christmas Carol (1979)
- Virus (1980) - Dr. Krause
- Suzanne (1980) - Andrew McDonald
- War Brides (1980) - Strachan
- Silence of the North (1981) - The Wildman
- Murder by Phone (1982) - Fil Thorner
- The Grey Fox (1982) - Jack Budd
- The Dead Zone (1983) - Vice President
- Gentle Sinners (1983) - Mr. Smith
- Louisiana (1984) - doctor
- The Execution of Raymond Graham (1985) - prison guard Coombs
- Love and Larceny (1985) - Dan Bigley
- The Climb (1986) - Peter Aschenbrenner
- Hot Money (1986) - D.A. Dillon
- Act of Vengeance (1986) - Capt. McCullough
- Dead of Winter (1987) - Officer Mullavy
- Crazy Moon (1987) - Alec
- Welcome Home (1989) - Senator Camden
- Where the Heart Is (1990) - Hamilton
- Run (1991) - Matt Halloran
- The Hitman (1991) - Captain Chambers
- Chaindance (1991) - Warden Slade
- Dangerous Intentions (1995) - Andrew
- Wings of Courage (1995) - Pierre Deley
- Bad Moon (1996) - Sheriff Jenson
- Beautiful Joe (2000) - Lou
- The 6th Day (2000) - Speaker Day
- Crossfire Trail (2001, TV Movie) - Gene Thompson
