= Aéropostale (aviation) =

French airline (1918–1933)

Compagnie Générale Aéropostale
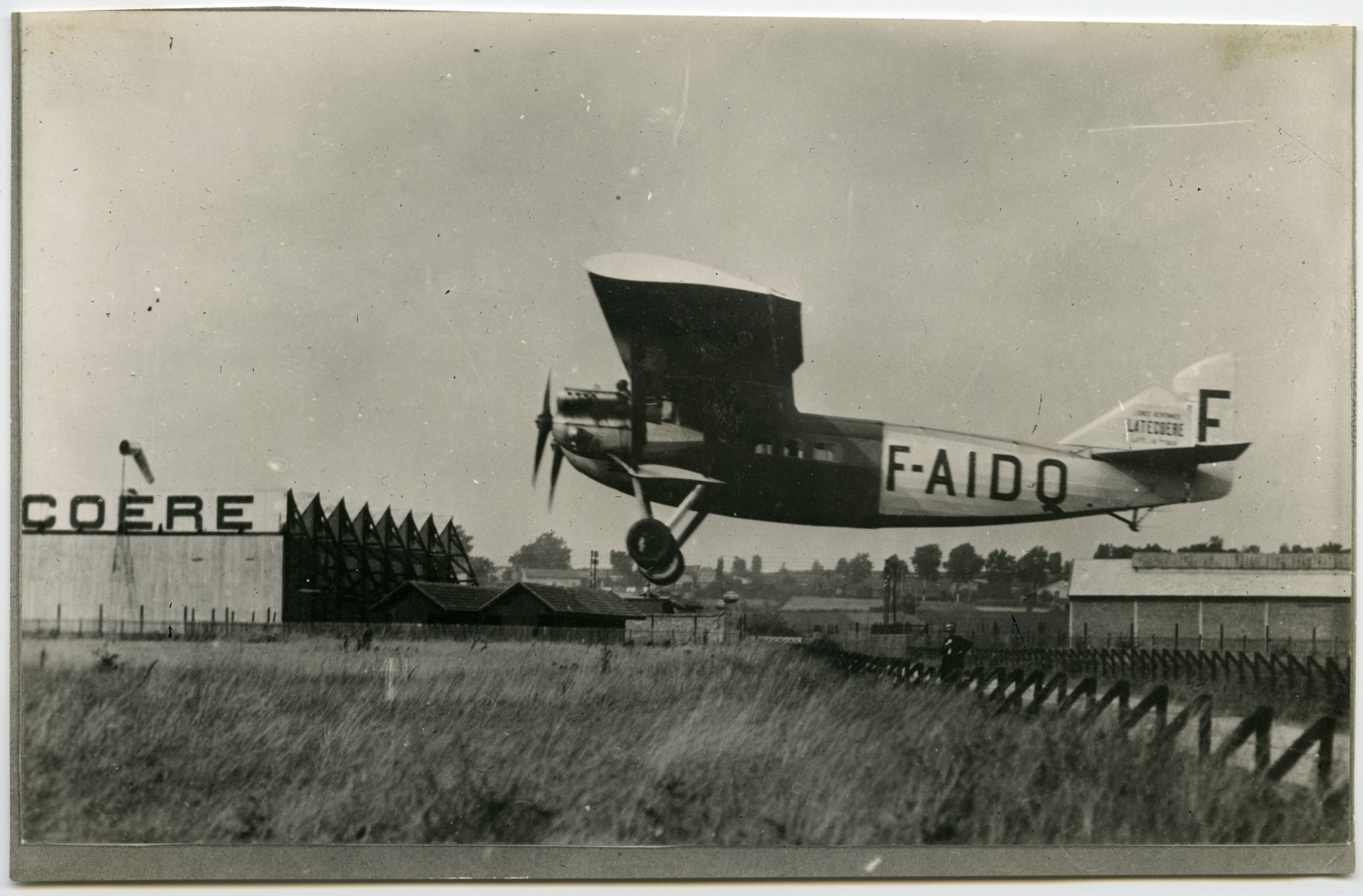
- Latécoère 15
- Founded: 25 December 1918; 107 years ago (as Société des lignes Latécoère)
- Commenced operations: 22 March 1919; 107 years ago
- Ceased operations: 7 October 1933 (merged with Air Orient, Air Union, CFRNA and SGTA to form Air France)
- Operating bases: Toulouse–Lasbordes; Toulouse–Montaudran
- Destinations: Barcelona, Dakar, Casablanca
- Headquarters: Toulouse, France
- Key people: Pierre-Georges Latécoère

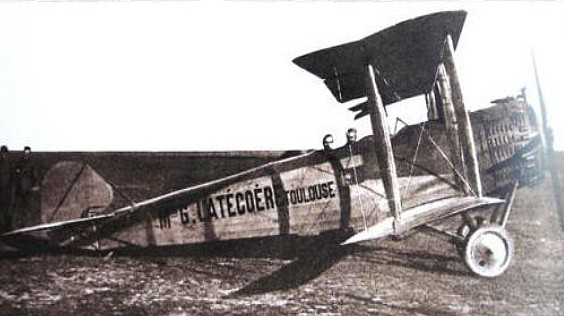
Salmson 2 Berline of Lignes Aériennes Latécoère, c.1918.

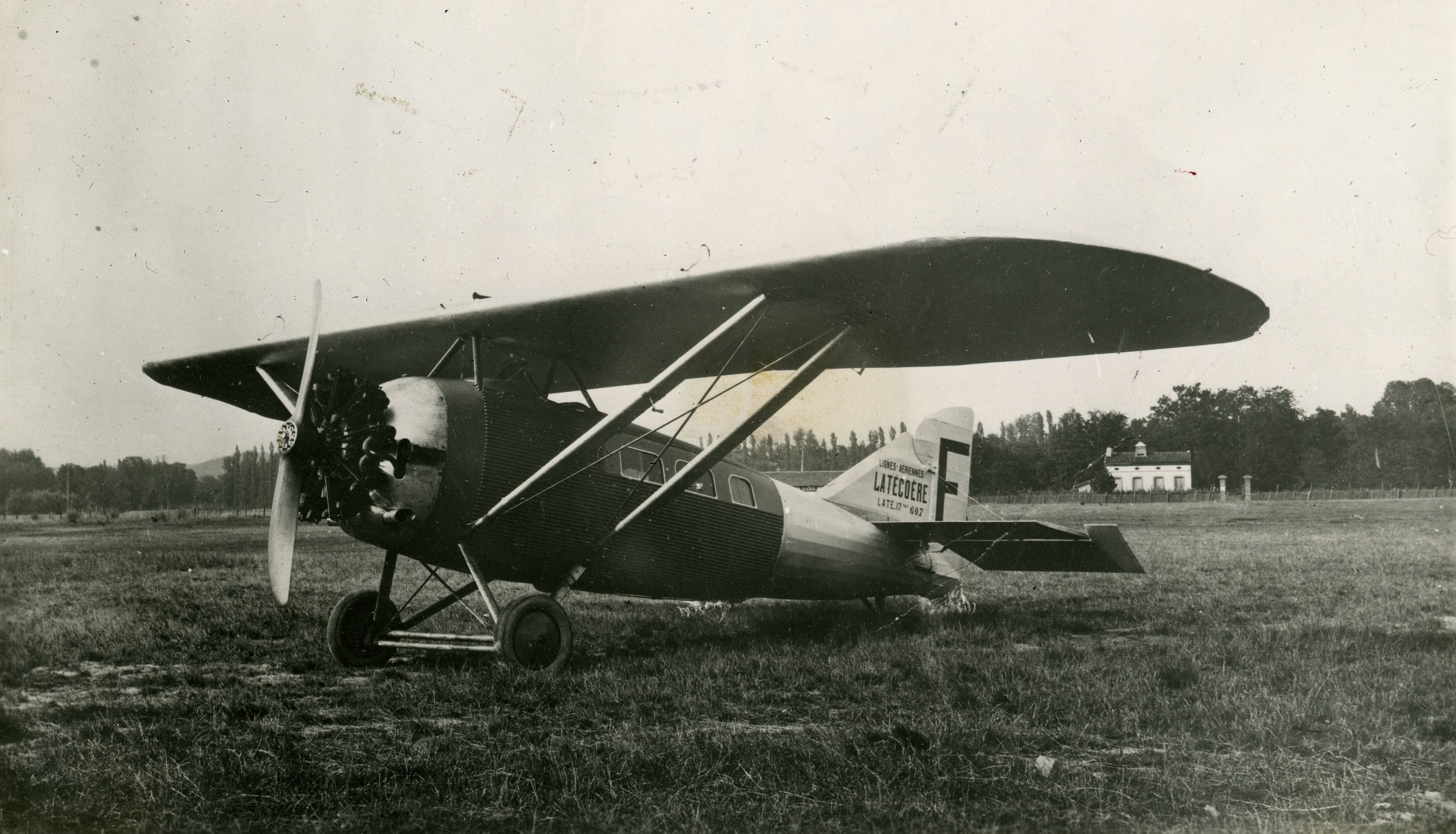
Latécoère 17 à Montaudran

Compagnie Générale Aéropostale, called Aéropostale in short, was a pioneering aviation company which operated from 1918 to 1933. It was founded in 1918 in Toulouse, France, as Société des Lignes Latécoère, also known as Lignes Aériennes Latécoère or simply La ligne (the line).

== History ==
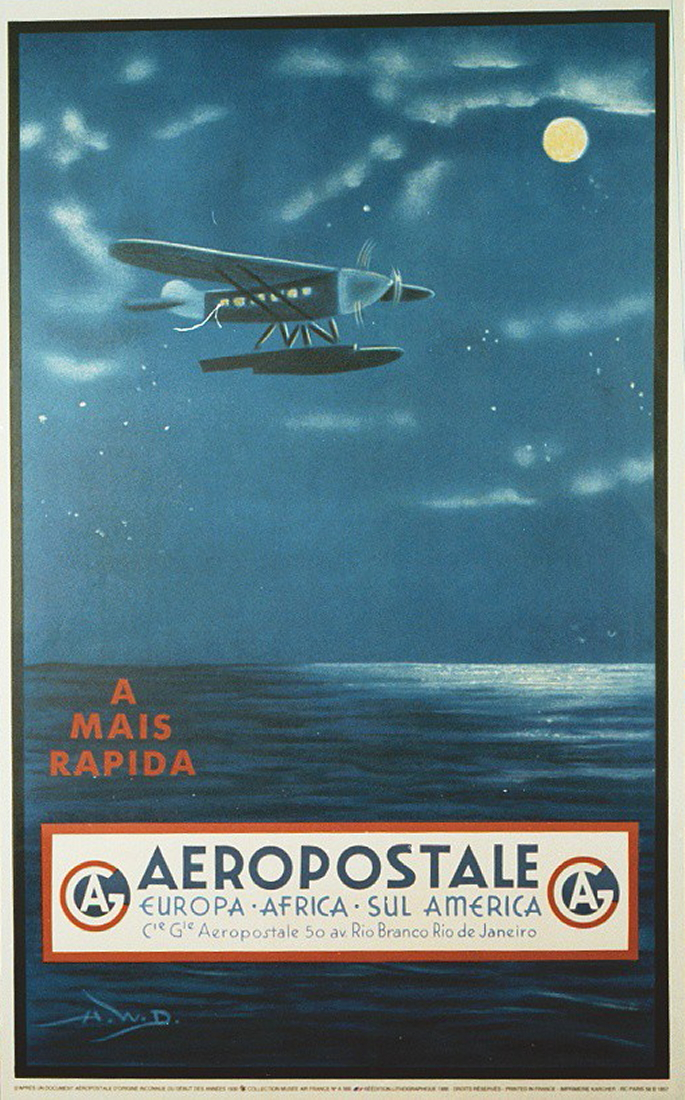

=== The beginning ===
Aéropostale founder Pierre-Georges Latécoère envisioned an air route connecting France to the French colonies in Africa and South America. The company's activities were to specialise in, but were by no means restricted to Airmail|airborne postal services. The company was formed on December 25, 1918.

Between 1921 and 1927 it operated as Compagnie Générale d'Entreprises Aéronautiques (CGEA). In 1924, Jean Mermoz established a route between Toulouse and Barcelona in Spain, flying over the Pyrenees. In 1926, a route was added from Casablanca, Morocco, flying over Sahara desert to Dakar, Senegal, from where the mail was shipped by steamer to South America. The first non-stop flight between Toulouse and Saint-Louis (Senegal) began in 1927.

After troubles with its planes, due to long flights to South America, in April 1927 Latécoère decided to sell 93% of his business to a Brazilian-based French businessman named Marcel Bouilloux-Lafont. Using these assets Bouilloux-Lafont then founded the Compagnie Générale Aéropostale, better known as Aéropostale.

=== Aéropostale ===
In November 1927 regular flights between Rio de Janeiro and Natal were started. Expansion then continued to Paraguay and in July 1929 a regularly scheduled route across the Andes Mountains to Santiago, Chile, was started, later extending down to Tierra del Fuego in the Southern part of Chile. Finally, on May 12–13, 1930, the trip across the South Atlantic by air finally took place: a Latécoère 28 mail plane fitted with floats and a 650 horsepower (480 kW) Hispano-Suiza engine made the first nonstop flight. Aéropostale pilot Jean Mermoz flew 3,058 kilometres (1,900 mi) from Dakar to Natal in 19 hours, 35 minutes, with his plane transporting 122 kilograms (269 lb) of mail.

Aéropostale was dissolved in 1932 and merged with a number of other aviation companies (Air Orient, Société Générale de Transport Aérien, Air Union, and Compagnie Internationale de Navigation) to create Air France.

== Aéropostale pilots ==
Developed in the aftermath of World War I, air mail service owed much to the bravery of its earliest pilots. During the 1920s, every flight was a dangerous adventure, and sometimes fatal. The period was eloquently described by the French writer Antoine de Saint-Exupéry – himself an Aéropostale pilot – in his novel Vol de Nuit (Night Flight), in which he describes a postal flight through the skies of South America.

Aéropostale's roster of pilots included such aviation legends as:

- Jean Mermoz
- Antoine de Saint-Exupéry
- Henri Guillaumet
- Marcel Reine
- Emile Lécrivain
- Pierre Deley
- Henri Larrieu (1893–1974)
- Raymond Vanier

== Aircraft ==
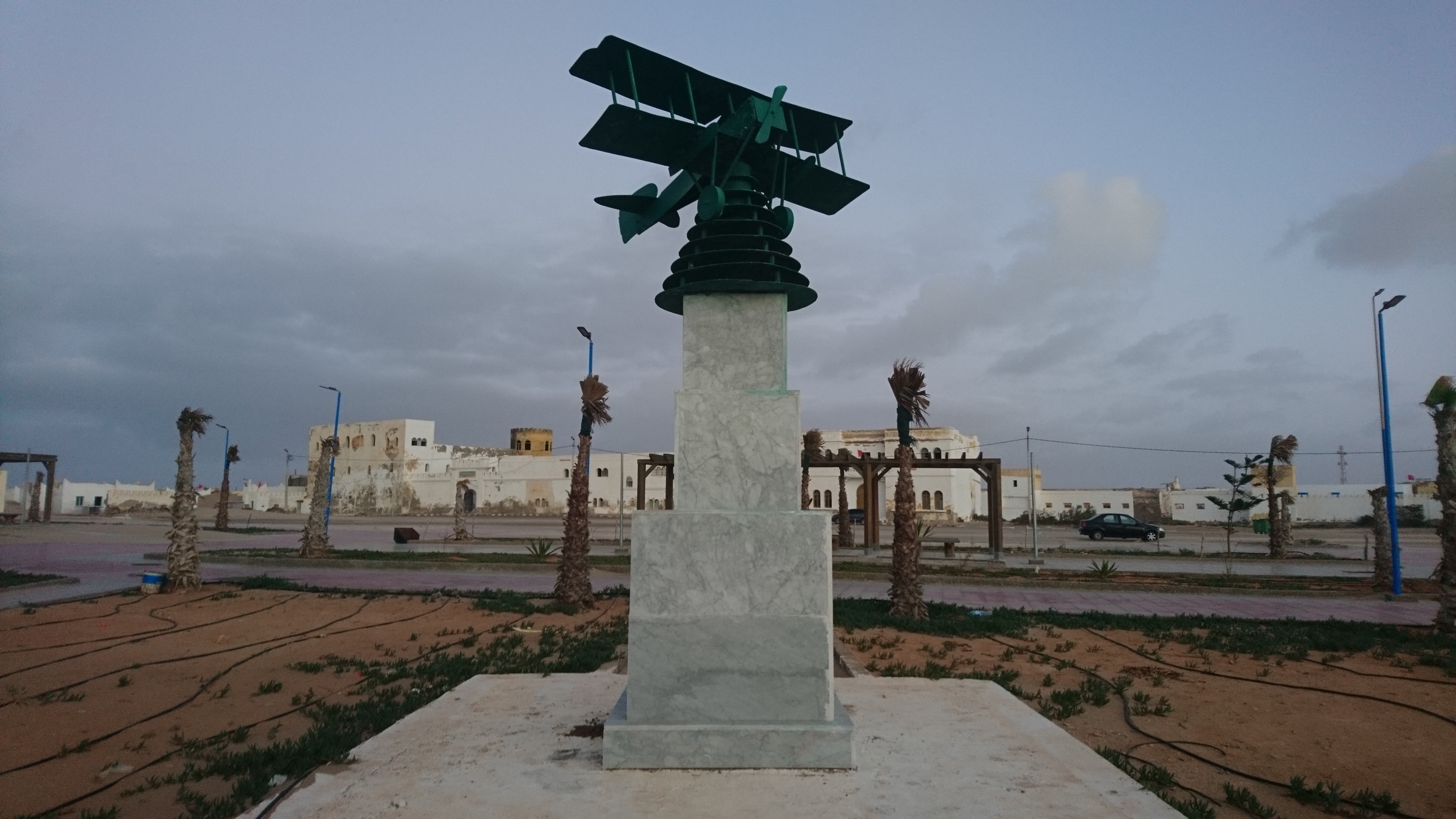
Aéropostale monument in Tarfaya.

Among the aircraft operated by the two airlines were:

- Blériot 5190
- One hundred Breguet 14s
- Farman F.70, for passenger and mail routes between Casablanca and Dakar and also from Algiers to Biskra.
- Latécoère 15
- Latécoère 17
- Latécoère 26
- Latécoère 28
- Latécoère 300
- Couzinet 71 III Arc en ciel
- Salmson 2 Berline

== Film ==
- Night Flight (1933 film), a 1933 film starring Clark Gable, was based on the novel by Antoine de Saint Exupéry, which recounted his real life experiences when he managed and flew for the Aeroposta Argentina subsidiary in South America. In the movie the airline was given the fictitious name Trans-Andean European Air Mail.
- In 1995, Futuroscope paid homage to Aéropostale pilot Henri Guillaumet with a 3D IMAX film by Jean-Jacques Annaud, in Wings of Courage (les Ailes du Courage), chronicling the pilot's crash on the frozen lake surface of Laguna del Diamante in the Andes, while flying mail for the South American subsidiary, Aeroposta Argentina. Guillaumet was portrayed by Craig Sheffer, Antoine de Saint-Exupéry by Tom Hulce, and Jean Mermoz played by Val Kilmer.

== See also ==
- Aéropostale, a U.S. apparel outlet that took its name and some of its design cues from the Compagnie générale aéropostale.
- Aeropostal Alas de Venezuela, normally referred to as just Aeropostal, an airline in Venezuela, established after the government took over air routes previously operated by the French Aéropostale
- Aeroposta Argentina, a subsidiary in Argentina.
