= Lycée Franco-Argentin Jean Mermoz =

School in Argentina

- Liceo Jean Mermoz
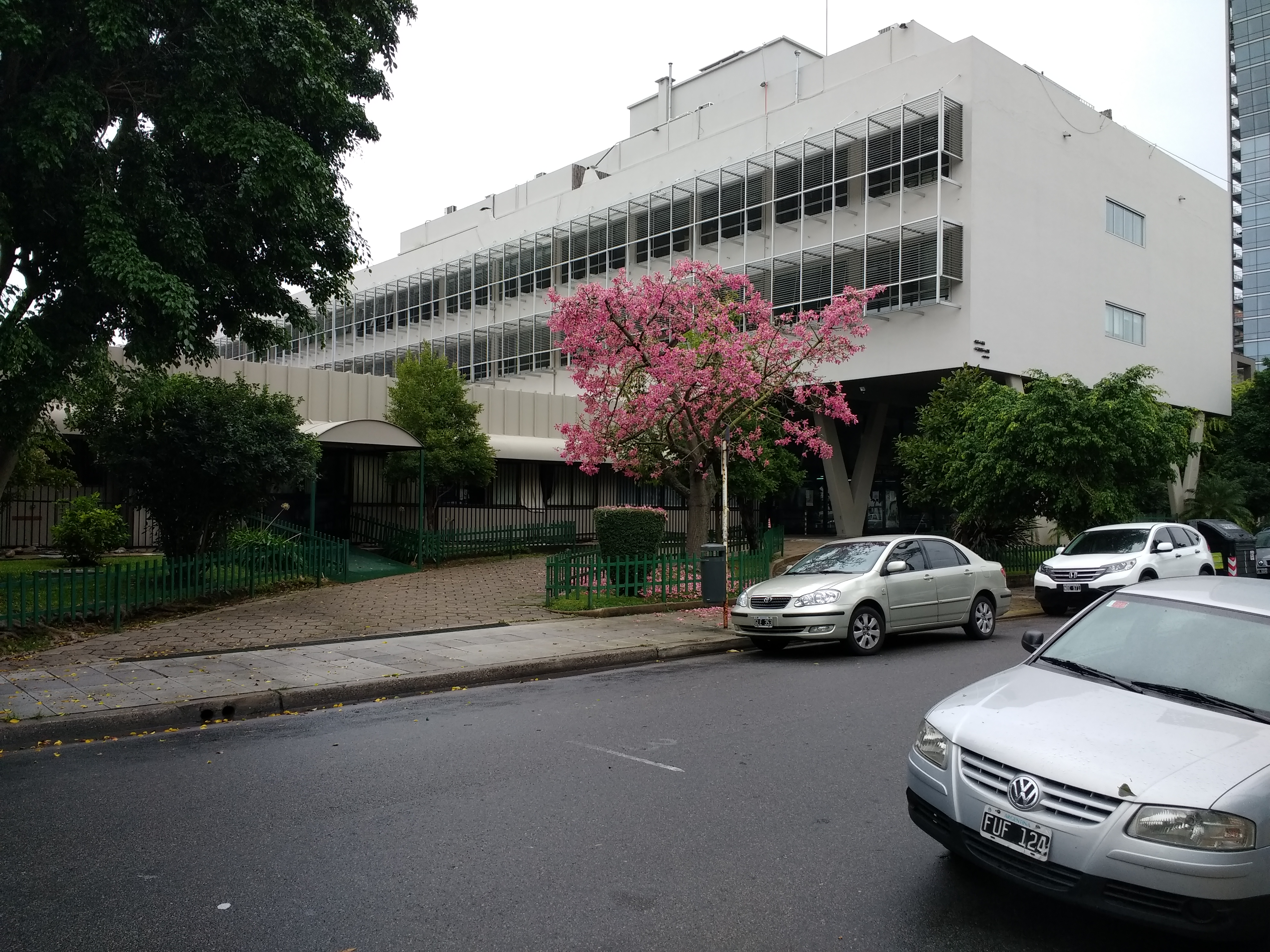

Location
- Ramsay 2131, CABA, Buenos Aires, Argentina; 34.5512°S 58.4420°W

Information
- Website: lyceemermoz.edu.ar

Lycée Franco-Argentin Jean Mermoz (Spanish: Liceo Jean Mermoz) is a large French–Argentine school constituted by three educational levels. The school building is situated in the Buenos Aires neighbourhood of Belgrano, Argentina.

It is directly operated by the Agency for French Education Abroad (AEFE), an agency of the French government.

== History ==
The school was founded on October 3, 1967 as a result of a cooperation agreement between France and Argentina. Two days later, the first president of the Fifth Republic Charles De Gaulle placed the cornerstone of the future building. Finally the Lycée opened its doors on March 10, 1969. Its name honors the courage of French airman Jean Mermoz and his contribution to the development of South America's aviation.

The objective of the 1967 French–Argentine cooperation agreement was the integration of both educational systems as a means to improve mutual understanding between the countries. Graduates are expected to complete a rigorous academic program and to demonstrate a strong sense of public responsibility and exemplary citizenship. Completion of the course of study gives graduates the opportunity to enter both the Argentine and French University systems

The Lycée Franco-Argentin Jean Mermoz offers a fully bilingual French–Spanish education as well as a solid English program that certifies students to the B2 level of the Common European Framework for Languages. Educational programs are inspired in fundamental human rights values and French and Argentine academic domestic traditions as well as in students' academic excellence. Students get the opportunity to obtain two academic degrees, baccalauréat and bachillerato, corresponding to the French and Argentine titles similar to high school in the United States.

== Three educational levels ==
The first level begins at kindergarten where students will perform their first tasks. Games and rules will be useful to teach and enforce student's behavior allocating positive incentives to help little kids to develop their character within social activities. Games and activities are fully bilingual after which students are expected to know writing and reading basis in French and Spanish.

The second level continues at elementary school where students will learn to master writing and reading skills. Furthermore, students will learn geometry and arithmetical basics as well as social and natural sciences. Moreover, young kids will be introduced and encouraged to learn core values such as teamwork, solidarity and critical spirit through the sports' discipline and fine arts.

The third level is the baccalauréat where students will be given instruments to develop their own abilities to achieve a solid understanding of math, social and natural sciences. In addition young citizens will learn philosophical and historical disciplines and, in turn, both disciplines will enhance students' ability to understand the world and individuals.
