= Wings of Courage =

- IMAX theatrical release poster
- Directed by: Jean-Jacques Annaud
- Written by: Alain Godard; Jean-Jacques Annaud
- Produced by: Jean-Jacques Annaud; Richard Briggs; Antoine Compin; Charis Horton
- Starring: Craig Sheffer; Tom Hulce; Elizabeth McGovern; Val Kilmer
- Cinematography: Robert Fraisse
- Edited by: Louise Rubacky
- Music by: Gabriel Yared
- Production company: Iwerks Entertainment
- Distributed by: Sony Pictures Classics
- Release dates: April 21, 1995 (United States); September 18, 1996 (France)
- Running time: 40 minutes (United States); 50 minutes (France)
- Countries: France; United States
- Language: English
- Budget: $20 million
- Box office: $15,054,636

Wings of Courage is a 1995 drama film directed by Jean-Jacques Annaud and starring Craig Sheffer, Val Kilmer, Elizabeth McGovern and Tom Hulce. The 40-minute or 50-minute film (run time depending on territory) was written by Annaud with Alain Godard. It was the first dramatic film shot in the IMAX format.

Wings of Courage is an account of the real-life story of early airmail operations in South America.

== Plot ==
In 1930 South America, a small group of French pilots led by aviation pioneer Antoine de Saint-Exupéry (Tom Hulce) struggle to prove they can offer a reliable airmail service over the Andes. When one of the young airmail pilots, Henri Guillaumet (Craig Sheffer), crashes on such a flight in the Andes, a search is started. Henri has to try and get back to civilization on foot. Back home, his wife Noelle (Elizabeth McGovern) and colleagues start to fear the worst.

== Cast ==
- Craig Sheffer as Henri Guillaumet
- Elizabeth McGovern as Noelle Guillaumet
- Tom Hulce as Antoine de Saint-Exupéry
- Val Kilmer as Jean Mermoz
- Ken Pogue as Pierre Deley
- Ron Sauvé as Jean-René Lefebvre
- Freddy Andreiuci as Young Pilot
- Molly Parker as Jean's Dance Partner (uncredited)

== Production ==
Wings of Courage was the first IMAX 3-D feature film created to be projected on the world's largest screens, with a process that uses a wider film gauge, more intense light and a brighter screen (covered with five coats of silver). The 3-D glasses were also a new type, liquid crystal lenses that are controlled by radio waves with each lens blinking 48 times a second, in sync with the projected image. The film was shot on location over 50 days in Banff National Park, Alberta, Canada with an additional 10 days of photography in Vancouver, British Columbia, Canada.

== Reception ==
For Roger Ebert', Wings of Courage is "... a technical, rather than an artistic achievement." In the review in The New York Times, Caryn James had a similar evaluation: "'Wings of Courage' is a swooping, old-fashioned adventure tale that uses flashy newfangled technology. The first fiction movie made for IMAX 3-D (the format that makes everyone wear oversized, goofy-looking goggles), this 40-minute film plays to the strengths of its 3-D technique. It's a winning ploy. Film critic Leonard Maltin considered Wings of Courage, "Beautiful scenery aside, this is a lumbering, boring true-life adventure ... Dramatically speaking, it's about as lively as a 1930s Monogram programmer.
