= Antoine de Saint Exupéry Airport =

Antoine de Saint-Exupéry Airport
- IATA: OES; ICAO: SAVN

Summary
- Airport type: Public
- Serves: San Antonio Oeste, Argentina
- Elevation AMSL: 85 ft / 26 m
- Coordinates: 40°45′05″S 65°02′05″W

Map
- Location of the airport in Argentina

Runways
Direction	Length		Surface
Direction	m	ft	Surface
12/30	1,800	5,906	Asphalt
- Sources: WAD SkyVector Google Maps

Antoine de Saint Exupéry Airport (Spanish: Aeropuerto Antoine de Saint Exupéry, IATA: OES, ICAO: SAVN) is an airport serving San Antonio Oeste, a city in the Río Negro Province of Argentina. The airport is named after the French author-aviator Antoine de Saint-Exupéry.

== Facilities ==
The terminal building is very similar in architectural design to others in the Patagonian region, basically of a simple, plain design with appropriately sized common areas, which provides an acceptable level of service for the area's normal traffic. However the terminal building also features a mural by Uruguayan artist Carlos Páez Vilaró in its main hall, painted in December 1989.

The airport is 1.3 kilometres (1 mi) inland from the San Matías Gulf. Southeast approach and departure may be over the water. The runway has greater than 300 metres (980 ft) unpaved overruns on each end. The San Antonio Oeste non-directional beacon (Ident: SAN) is located on the field.

== History ==
San Antonio Oeste's airport was renamed after the French writer-aviator Antoine de Saint-Exupéry, who frequently surveyed routes in the country as the director of Aeroposta Argentina, the company that created a stopover airport at that location en route to Comodoro Rivadavia. A small museum exhibit was created in the airport's terminal building honoring its origins. It came into being on October 31, 1929, when a flight route began between Comodoro Rivadavia and Bahia Blanca, with stops at San Antonio Oeste and Trelew. The following day Aeroposta Argentina inaugurated its regular service to the airport.

Due to a lack of facility, runway, and airport maintenance for over 20 years, commercial air services were discontinued to the airport in 2009. Currently only the local flying club and some private flights use the facility.

== See also ==
- Transport in Argentina
- List of airports in Argentina
