= Laguna del Diamante =

Lake in Argentina

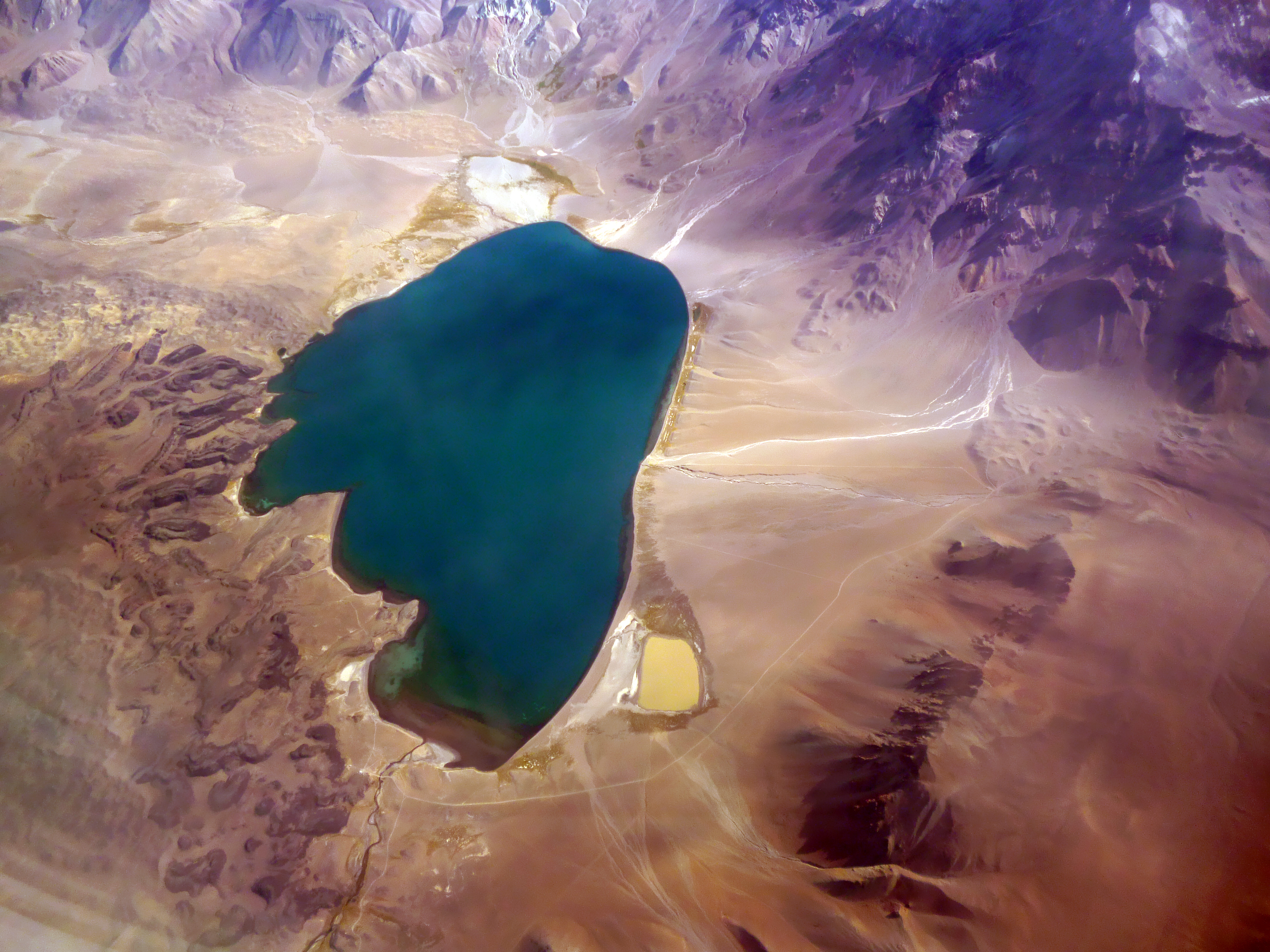
- Laguna del Diamante

- Location within Argentina
- Location: San Carlos Department, Mendoza Province
- Coordinates: 34°09′S 69°41′W
- Basin countries: Argentina
- Surface area: 14.1 km^{2} (5.4 sq mi)
- Surface elevation: 10,791 ft (3,289 m)

Laguna del Diamante (Spanish for "lake of the diamond") is a lake located in Mendoza Province, Argentina, in the San Carlos Department, some 220 kilometres (140 mi) southeast of Mendoza. It covers a surface area of about 14.1 square kilometres (5.4 sq mi) and is one of the largest freshwater resources in the Province. Nearby is Maipo volcano. The volcano and its reflection in the lake forms diamond-shape image, which gives the lake its name.

It is known for its beauty. However, few get the chance to see it because it is passable only in February and only via an off-road vehicle.

The lake was described by Antoine de Saint-Exupéry in his book Wind, Sand and Stars as quoted, "...he [Guillaumet] caught sight of a dark horizontal blot which he recognized as a lake Laguna Diamante".

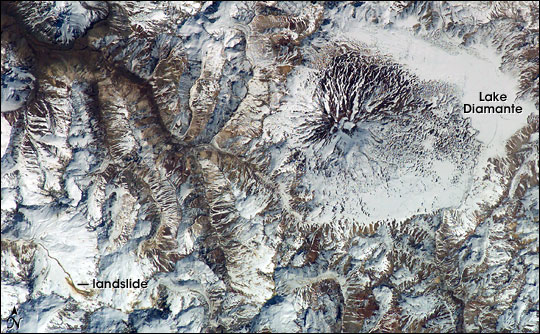
NASA satellite image of Lake Diamante and Maipo Volcano
