= Jean Mermoz =

French aviator

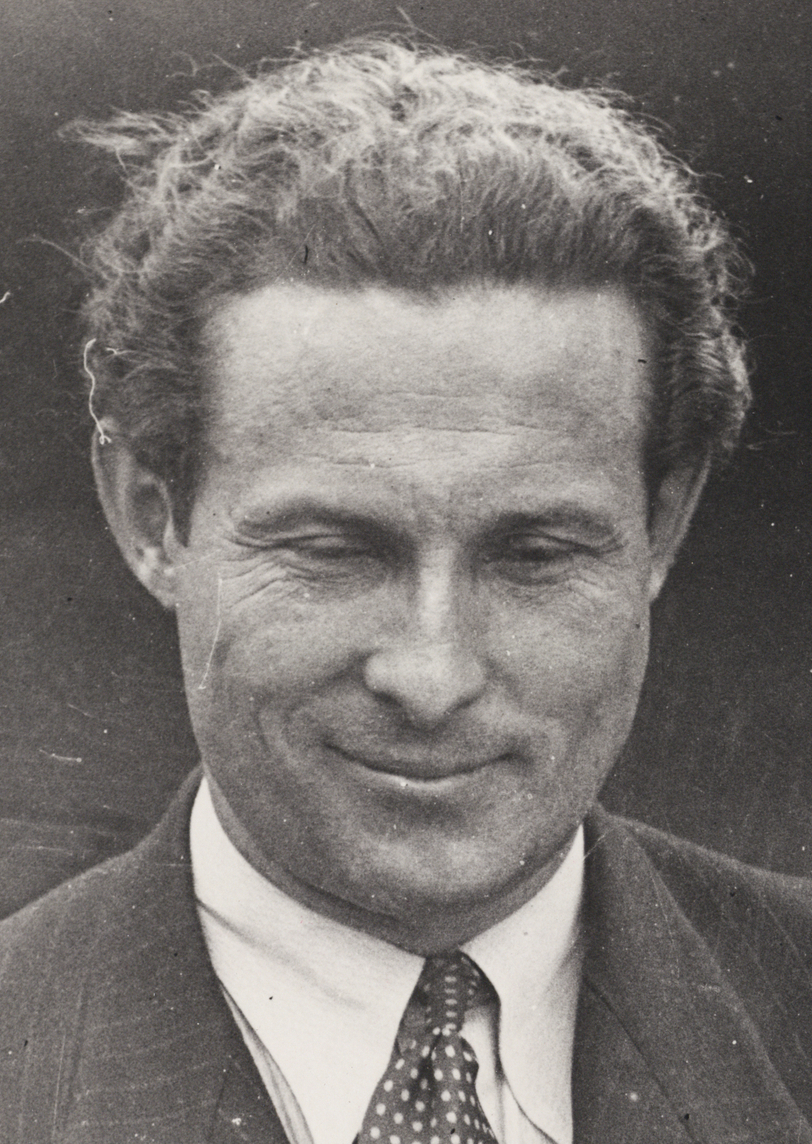
- Born: 9 December 1901; Aubenton, Aisne, France
- Disappeared: 7 December 1936 (aged 34); Atlantic Ocean, en route to Natal from Dakar
- Occupation: Aviator

Jean Mermoz (French: [ʒɑ̃ mɛʁmoz]; 9 December 1901 – 7 December 1936) was a French aviator, viewed as a hero by other pilots such as Antoine de Saint-Exupéry, and in his native France, where many schools bear his name. In Brazil, he also is recognized as a pioneer aviator.

== Career ==
In 1920 he met Max Delby, a teacher who helped him develop his career, and in April 1921 he flew as a pilot for the first time.

=== French Air Force ===
Mermoz joined the French Air Force in 1922, being assigned, as a pilot of the air force's 11th regiment, to duty in Syria. In 1924, he returned to France, having arguably been one of the most successful pilots in the Syrian operations. Mermoz relocated to Toulouse.

=== Latécoère ===
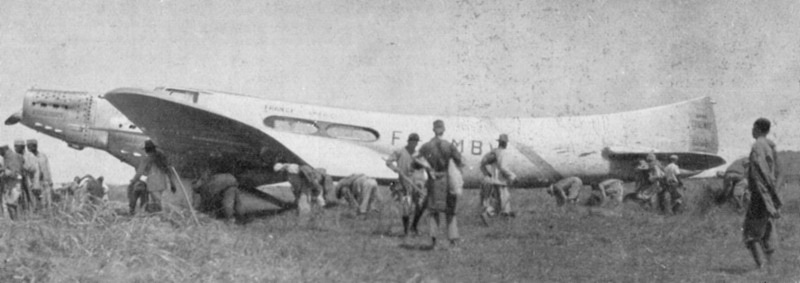
The Couzinet 70, "Arc-en-Ciel", F-AMBV, flown by Mermoz

Mermoz went on to become an airmail pilot, with Groupe Latécoère, and almost failed his entry exam by performing dangerous stunts to impress the director. (The director, Didier Daurat had this famous quote: "We don't need acrobats here, we need bus drivers.") He then did a normal, flawless flight and was hired. It was there that Mermoz met Antoine de Saint-Exupéry. At the Compagnie Générale Aéropostale, Mermoz travelled to Morocco, Senegal and other African areas.

In 1926, one of Mermoz's flights ended with an accident, when his plane crashed in the Sahara. He was then taken hostage by a group of rebel Tuaregs, but was fortunately found later alive.

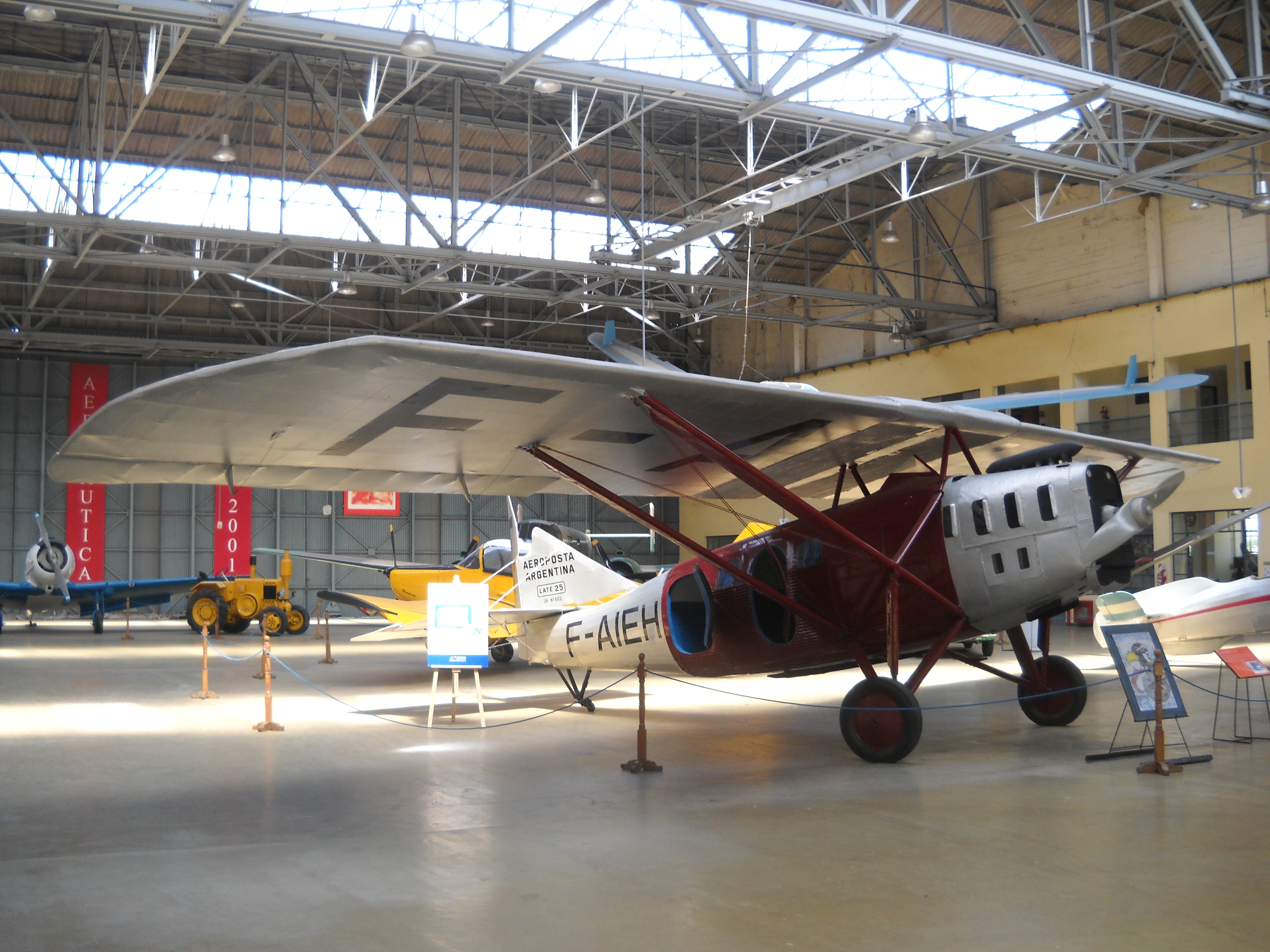
A Latécoère 25 in the Museo Nacional de Aeronáutica de Argentina, in the livery of Aeroposta Argentina

In 1927, Latécoère began building planes of his own design to replace the aging World War I aircraft Breguet 14. The Latécoère 25, (or "Laté 25") and, later, the Latécoère 26 and Latécoère 28 proved to be efficient aircraft when flying from Morocco to Senegal, and Mermoz himself flew the types on those routes on multiple occasions.

But Africa was only the beginning. Latécoère's project was to create a direct airline between France and South America. By 1929, it had become evident that it would be economically viable for France to establish a commercial air route to South America, so Mermoz and others flew over the Andes. Despite Mermoz finding the flying conditions over the Andes to be tough, he became the project's main pilot, determined to reach the Pacific Ocean, and he was able, after multiple stops, to reach Santiago, Chile. During that time, to save time, he decided to fly during the night, using light beacons and flares as guides; and his fellow pilots, for once, were a bit reluctant to see him do it, because they knew it would be their turn next. For some time, as transatlantic flights were not yet possible, steamboats linked both halves of the "Line".

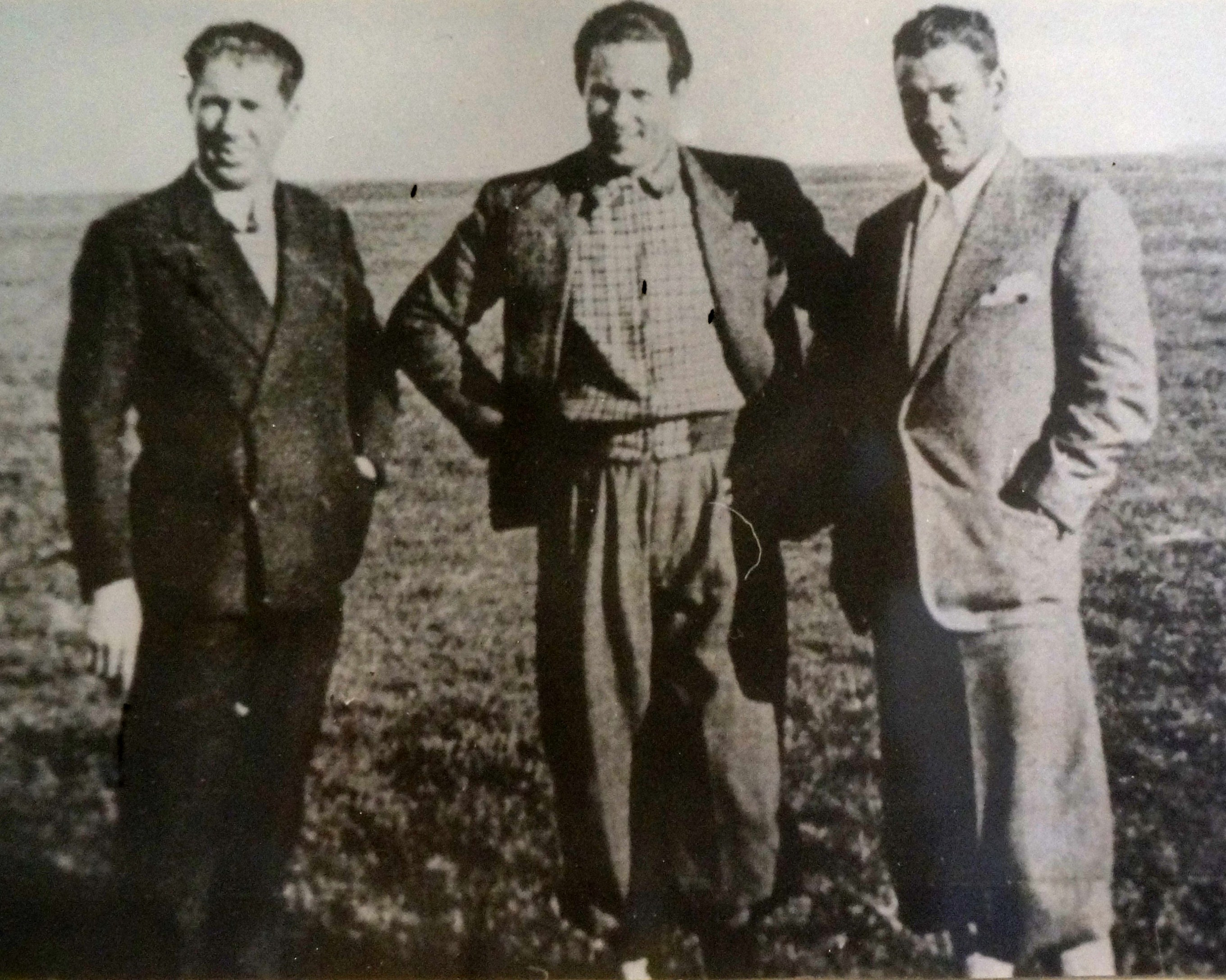
Mermoz, between Victor Etienne and Guillaumet; Río de Janeiro.

With a flight from Saint-Louis, Senegal, to Natal, Brazil, on 12–13 May 1930, the line was complete at last. the modified Laté 28 "Comte-de-la-Vaulx", however, did not prove reliable, and the pilot had to ditch at sea during the return flight. Mermoz, his two companions and the mail were rescued, but the plane sank during the attempt to tow it.

=== Air France ===
In 1933, Mermoz was appointed general inspector by Air France. That same year, he arrived in Buenos Aires, Argentina, where he and Saint-Exupéry became important persons during the infancy of Aeroposta Argentina, which would later become Aerolíneas Argentinas. Mermoz and Saint-Exupéry flew many dangerous flights for the then new air company. They became regarded as two of the most important men in the history of Argentine commercial aviation. From 1934 to 1936, Mermoz would fly private expeditions on Latécoère 300 airplanes. He flew 24 expeditions with that type. In 1935, he also flew de Havilland DH.88 "Comet" airplanes.

== Disappearance at sea ==
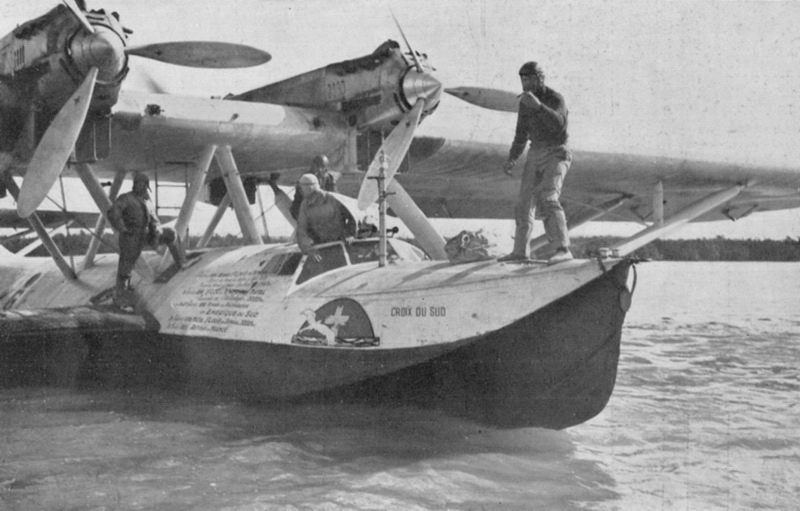
Latécoère 300 Croix-du-Sud

On 7 December 1936, on a planned flight from Dakar to Natal, Brazil, he turned back shortly after take-off to report a troublesome engine on his Latécoère 300 Croix-du-Sud (Southern Cross). After learning that he would have to wait for another one to be prepared, he took off again in the same plane after a quick repair, concerned that he would be late in delivering the mail. (His last words before boarding the plane were "Quick, let's not waste time anymore.")

Four hours later, the radio station received a short message, where Mermoz reported that he had to cut the power on the aft starboard engine. The message was interrupted abruptly. No further messages were received, and neither the Laté 300 nor the crew were ever recovered.

It is assumed that the engine they had tried to repair lost its propeller midflight, and being one of the aft engines, the loose propeller either badly damaged or cut the hull entirely, causing the plane to lose its tail and crash instantly. Henri Guillaumet, one of Mermoz's fellow pilots, had encountered the same problem a few months before, but as his own engine was on the forward side, airspeed had been sufficient to maintain the propeller in place until the landing.

== Alleged sabotage of the "Southern Cross" ==
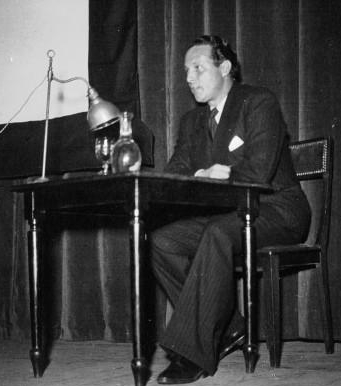
Jean Mermoz, 1935

In 1941, the Investigative Commission of Anti-National Activities of the Parliament of Uruguay, after denunciations filed before the Deputy Tomas Brena and Julio Iturbide, claimed that the last two airmail flights of Air France, and with result the death of Collenot first and Mermoz later, had been sabotaged by Nazi Fifth Columnists of the National German Socialist Workers Party operating in Uruguay. No evidence has appeared to substantiate this claim.

The crew of Latécoère 300 Croix-du-Sud, F-AKGF, on that day were:

- Jean Mermoz, Pilot
- Alexandre Pichodou, Copilot
- Henri Ezan, Navigator
- Edgar Cruveilher, Radio Officer
- Jean Lavidalie, Mechanic

=== An unreliable plane ===
Mermoz had grown dissatisfied with the quality of the planes he and his companions had to pilot. In the months before his demise, he had been vocal about the aircraft's poor quality in both design and material, and was quoted saying "Ask me to pilot anything, even a wheelbarrow, but at one condition: make sure it is solid". A similar plane, Laté 301 F-AOIK Ville-de-Buenos-Aires, had disappeared eight months before his own, causing the death, among others, of his mechanic and friend Collenot. The complicated Hispano-Suiza 12Ner engines thought to be the cause of both crashes were later decommissioned and replaced with older, more reliable ones. His message had been heard too late.

== Tributes ==
France

- A museum in Aubenton (Museum Jean Mermoz)
- An avenue in Lyon (Avenue Jean Mermoz) and a metro station (Mermoz-Pinel) on Line D are named in his honour.
- In 1937 Mermoz was honoured by a series of two French postage stamps bearing his image.
- A road in Paris (rue Jean Mermoz), between the Champs Elysées and rue Saint-Honoré has been named after him.
- The pilot training school in Rungis is named Institut aéronautique Jean Mermoz.
- The French city of Toulouse has a road (rue Jean Mermoz) and a subway station on Line A (Métro Mermoz) named in his honour. A large abstract steel sculpture commemorating Mermoz and the pilots of the Aéropostale was erected in the city's Jardin Royal park in 2001.
- The French town of Saint-Jean-Cap-Ferrat has a road (avenue Jean Mermoz) named in his honour.
- The French ocean liner Jean Mermoz built in 1955 was named after him.

South America

- A French lycée in Buenos Aires, Argentina, is named after him. The Lycée Franco-Argentin Jean Mermoz, a bilingual school, is located in the intersection of Ramsay and Juramento streets in Belgrano neighbourhood.
- A monument to Jean Mermoz exists in the proximity to Jorge Newbery Airpark in Buenos Aires, Argentina.
- One of the ATR-72 airliners (CX-JCL) in the fleet of BQB Líneas Aéreas is named after Jean Mermoz.
- Lycée franco-chilien "Alliance Française" Jean-Mermoz
- Jean Mermoz street in Natal, Rio Grande do Norte, Brazil.
- A primary and middle school is named after Jean Mermoz in São Paulo, Brazil.
- Aguja Mermoz (one of the subpeaks of the Cerro Fitz Roy/Chaltén Massif) is named after the pilot

Africa

- Jean-Mermoz International School (Ivory Coast)
- Lycée Français Jean-Mermoz (Senegal)
- Avenue Jean Mermoz, Saint Louis, Senegal
- Mermoz, a neighborhood of Dakar, Senegal

Middle East

- Lycée Français Jean Mermoz, Dubai, United Arab Emirates.

Other

- His epic flights over the Andes and across the Atlantic were commemorated in a film (Mermoz) for which Arthur Honegger wrote the music score. Two orchestral suites drawn from the score were recorded in the 1990s on CD and issued on the DG and Marco Polo labels.
- The Bugatti Atlantic was named as such an honorary to Mermoz by his friend Jean Bugatti.

== Writings ==
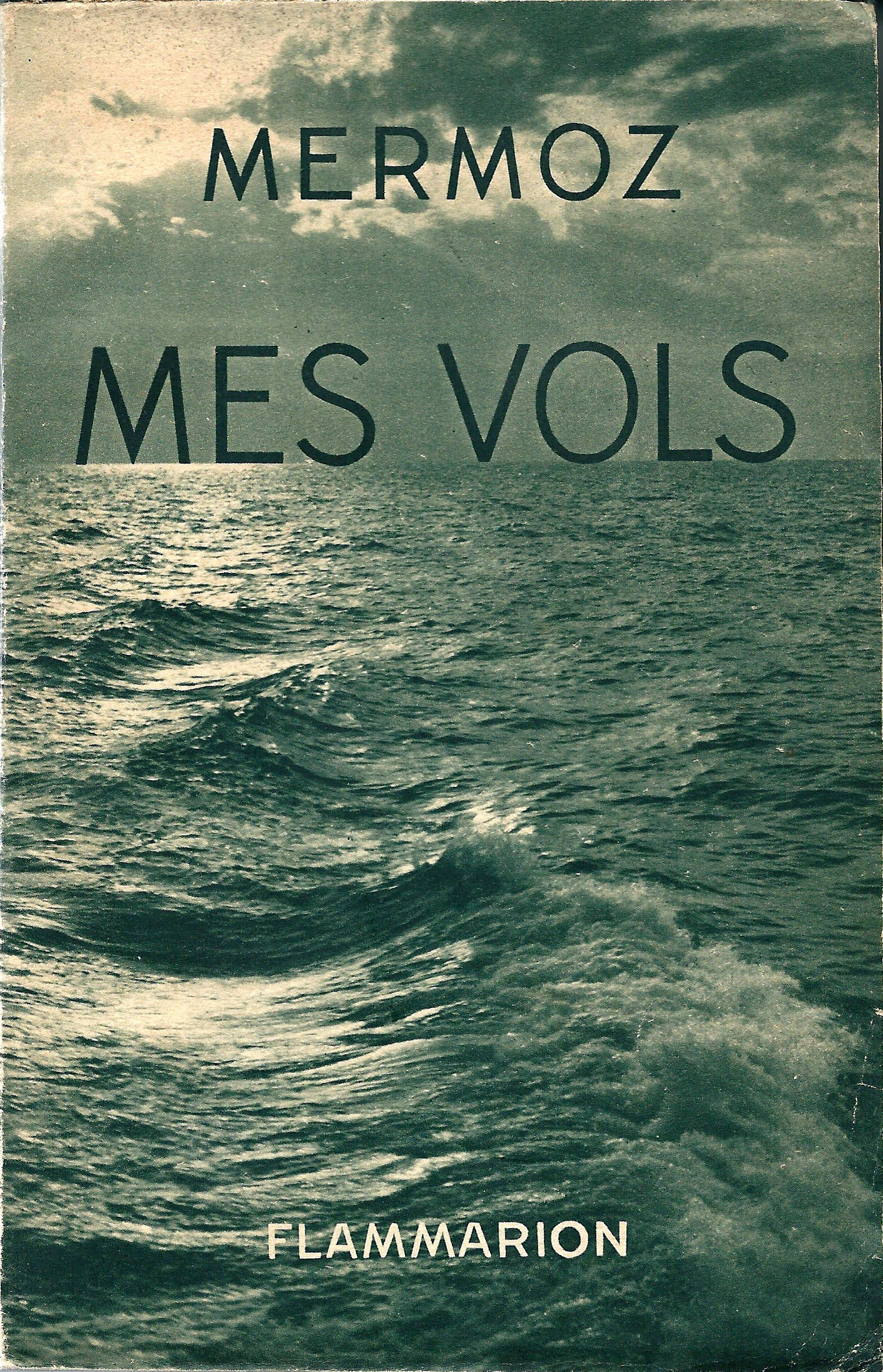

- Mes vols (Flammarion, 1937) : an unfinished collection of memories (« My Flights ») published shortly after his death, along with short homages from his best-known friends and admirers.
- Défricheur du ciel (Bernard Marck (ed.), Archipel, 2006) : edition of Mermoz's correspondence from 1921 to his death in 1936.

== In popular culture ==
In 1956 writer Jean-Michel Charlier in conjunction with artist Victor Hubinon published the biographical graphic novel Mermoz about the exploits of Mermoz. It was reissued in 1990 with title Mermoz, chevalier du ciel.

The 1995 docudrama Wings of Courage by French director Jean-Jacques Annaud was an account of early airmail pilots including Mermoz (played by Val Kilmer), Henri Guillaumet (played by Craig Sheffer), Saint-Exupéry played by Tom Hulce. The movie was the world's first dramatic picture shot in the IMAX-format.

Mermoz was a major character in Antonio Iturbe’s 2017 Spanish language novel A cielo abierto which was translated into English and published in 2021 with the title The Prince of the Skies.
