= Didier Daurat =

French aviator

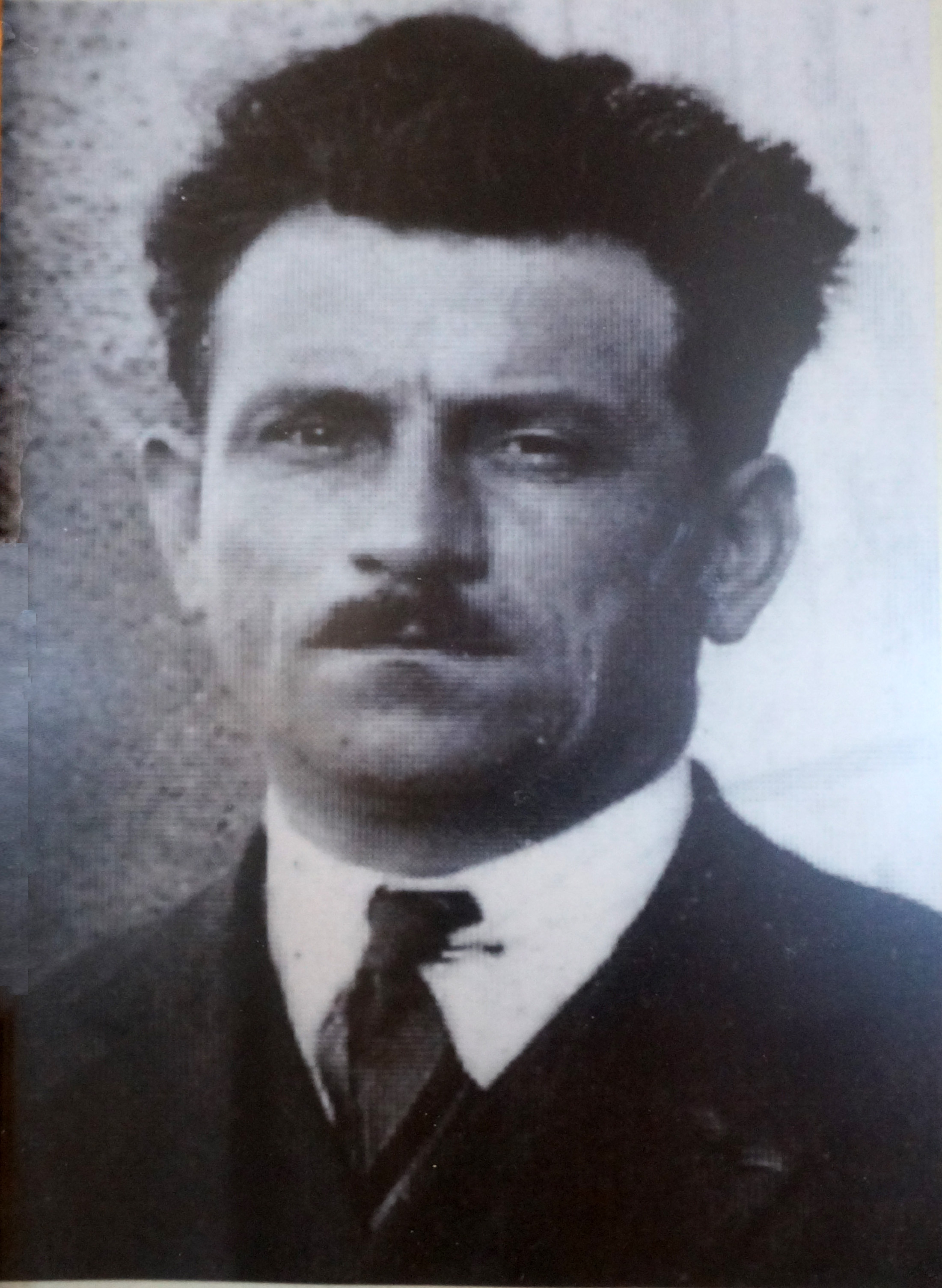
- Born: 2 January 1891; Montreuil-sous-Bois, France
- Died: 2 December 1969 (aged 78); Toulouse, France
- Occupations: Pilot, aviation executive

Didier Daurat (2 January 1891, Montreuil-sous-Bois – 2 December 1969, Toulouse) was a pioneer of French aviation.

== Career ==
Daurat was a fighter pilot during World War I, distinguishing himself by spotting the Paris Gun which was pounding Paris. After the war, he joined Latécoère, an airline company, which later became the Compagnie générale aéropostale - Aéropostale (later Air France), where he was a pilot and later operations director.

Many of his pilots began their careers as grease monkeys, taking apart, cleaning and reassembling engines. According to Daurat, that formed character and taught pilots to respect their machines. However, he knew when he saw a talented pilot. When Jean Mermoz presented himself in Toulouse and made a dazzling display of piloting skill, Daurat told him, "I don't need circus artists but bus drivers." (Je n'ai pas besoin d'artistes de cirque mais de conducteurs d'autobus.) Nevertheless, he hired him to clean the engines.

These methods proved their worth because the Latécoère lines, and later Aéropostale, achieved a high level of punctuality and reliability on the Toulouse-Saint-Louis-du-Sénégal route, and later from Toulouse-Santiago, Chile, with a crossing of the South Atlantic and the Andes.

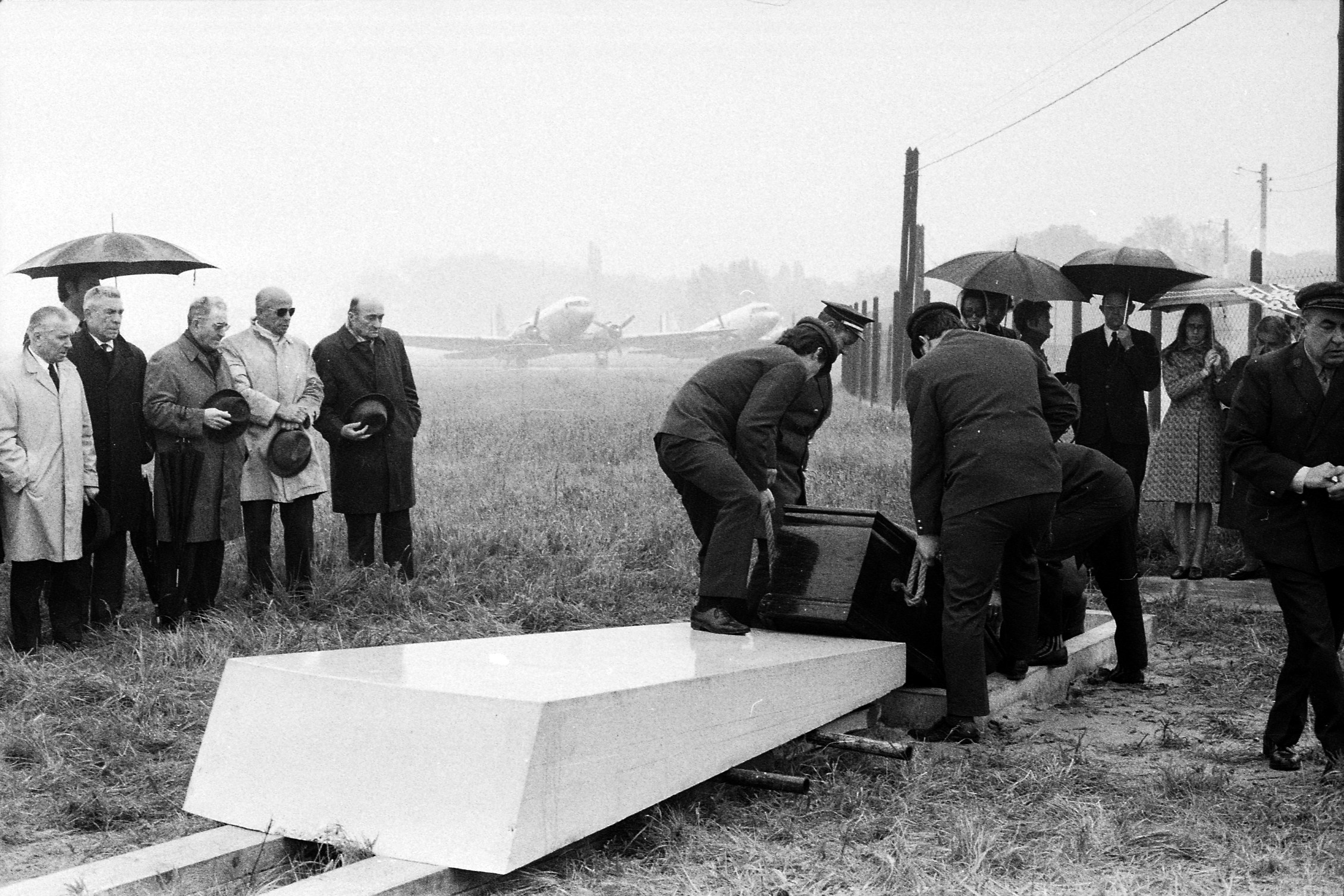
Burial of Daurat at Montaudran Airport, 1972.

When Aéropostale was integrated with Air France in 1933, Daurat was dismissed. He visited St. Louis in 1934, on a study tour of air transportation. In 1935, he founded the Air Bleu company, which transported mail throughout France by day as well as by night. Results were remarkable, but the company was militarised with the declaration of war in 1939.

Following the Liberation of France, he relaunched the night postal service before becoming operations chief for Air France at Orly, until his retirement in 1953.

== Death and legacy ==
He died in Toulouse in 1969, at age 79. At his request, he was granted the honour of being buried on the Toulouse-Montaudran Airport, the former base of Aéropostale. Antoine de Saint-Exupéry took inspiration from him for the character of Rivière in his best-seller Night Flight (Vol de nuit, 1931).

== Publications ==
- Saint-Exupéry tel que je l'ai connu (1954)
- Dans le vent des hélices (1956)
