= Henri Guillaumet =

French aviator

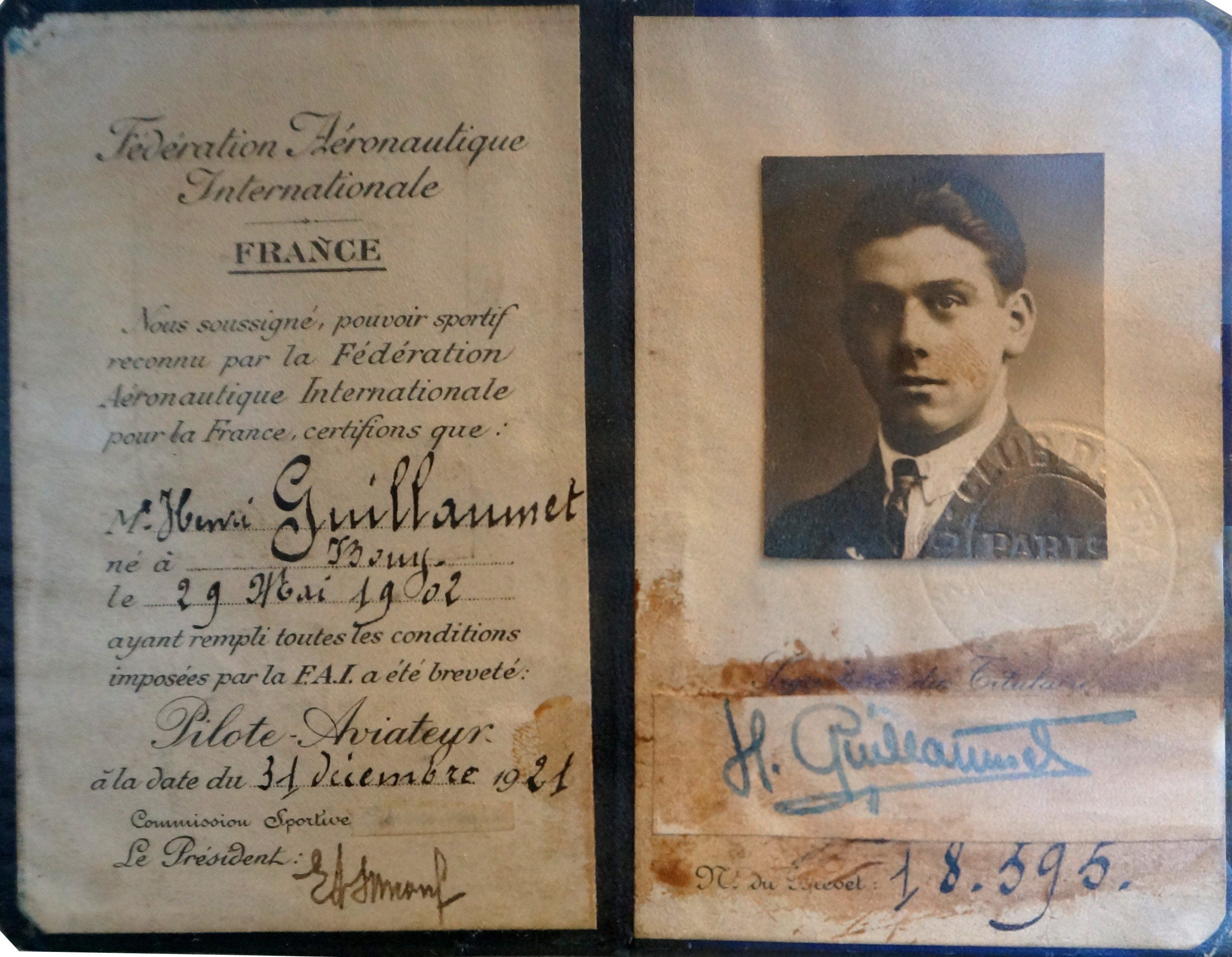
- Guillaumet's pilot's licence
- Born: May 29, 1902; Bouy, Marne
- Died: November 27, 1940 (aged 38); Mediterranean Sea
- Cause of death: Shot down
- Known for: Aviator

Henri Guillaumet (29 May 1902 – 27 November 1940) was a French aviator.

Guillaumet was born in Bouy, Marne. He was a pioneer of French aviation in the Andes, the South Atlantic and the North Atlantic. He contributed to the opening up of numerous new routes and is regarded by some as the best pilot of his age. "Je n'en ai pas connu de plus grand" (I've never known a greater one), said Didier Daurat, operations director of the Aéropostale.

Guillaumet carried the mail between Argentina and Chile. On Friday 13 June 1930, while crossing the Andes for the 92nd time, he crashed his Potez 25 at Laguna del Diamante in Mendoza, Argentina, because of bad weather. He walked for a week over three mountain passes. Though tempted to give up, he persisted while thinking of his wife, Noëlle, and the fact that if he died without being found, his life insurance would only pay out to her after four years. Finally on June 19 at dawn when he was rescued by a teenage boy. He reached a village whose inhabitants could not believe his story. This exploit made him stand out among the 'stars' of Aéropostale.

To his friend Antoine de Saint-Exupéry, who had come to find him, he said, "Ce que j'ai fait, je te le jure, aucune bête ne l'aurait fait." (What I have done, I swear to you, no animal would have done). Saint-Exupéry tells the adventure of Guillaumet in his 1939 book Terre des hommes (published in English as Wind, Sand and Stars).

After a number of south Atlantic crossings, he was appointed managing director of Air France.

On 27 November 1940, while flying to Syria with Jean Chiappe, the new French High Commissioner to the Levant, his four-engined Farman F.220 NC.2234 airliner Le Verrier was shot down by an Italian fighter over the Mediterranean Sea.

== In popular culture ==
=== Film ===
The 1995 docudrama Wings of Courage by French director Jean-Jacques Annaud was an account of early airmail pilots including Henri Guillaumet played by Craig Sheffer and Saint-Exupéry played by Tom Hulce. The movie was the world's first dramatic picture shot in the IMAX-format.

=== Literature ===
Guillaumet was a major character in Antonio Iturbe’s 2017 Spanish language novel A cielo abierto which was translated into English and published in 2021 with the title The Prince of the Skies.

=== Geography ===
Guillaumet is the namesake of Aguja Guillaumet, a mountain in the Patagonian Andes of Argentina.
