= Pierre-Georges Latécoère =

Aviation pioneer and founder of Aéropostale

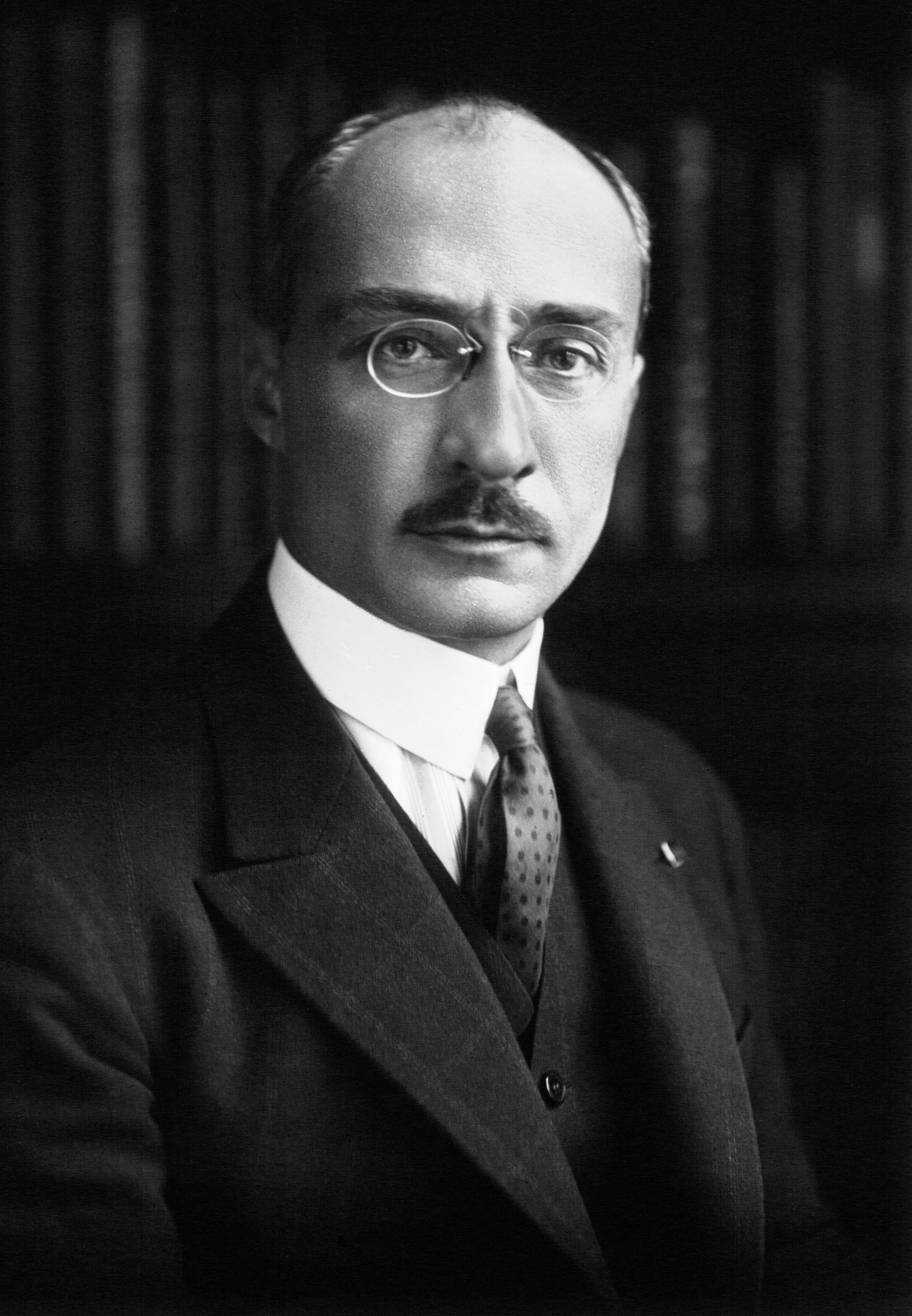
Latécoère in 1925

Pierre-Georges Latécoère (French: [pjɛʁ ʒɔʁʒ latekɔɛʁ]; 1883–1943) was a French pioneer of aeronautics. Born in Bagnères-de-Bigorre, France, he studied in the École Centrale Paris and, during the First World War, started a business in aeronautics. He directed plants that made planes and opened the first airlines that operated from France to Africa and South America.

Latécoère was the founder of the aeronautical industry in Toulouse. As the son of the owner of a sawmill in Bagnères-de-Bigorre in the Pyrenees, he took an early interest in technology. In 1903, after an outstanding secondary school career, he began his degree at the Parisian École Centrale Paris. On returning to the Pyrenees, he modernized his father's firm, specializing in the manufacture of railway wagons. Thus, during the First World War, the profits from government contracts allowed him to set up a large, modern factory in the Toulouse suburb of Montaudran. Before doing so, he had also produced a rush order of 600 Salmson aircraft, which the army urgently needed. Having become an aeronautical enthusiast, he decided to create the company Société des lignes Latécoère (later known as Aéropostale), carrying mail from France to Morocco, Senegal and South America – the first aircraft being flown by such well-known pilots as Mermoz and Saint-Exupéry. Finally, he started manufacturing aircraft in his own name, and notably the great seaplanes such as the Latécoère 631.

The Latécoère company still exists in 2024.
