= Night Flight (novel) =

1931 novel by Antoine de Saint-Exupéry

- First UK edition
- Author: Antoine de Saint-Exupéry
- Original title: Vol de nuit
- Translator: Stuart Gilbert
- Language: French
- Genre: Fiction
- Set in: Argentina
- Publication date: 1931
- Publication place: France
- English publication date: 1932
- Media type: Print

Night Flight, published as Vol de nuit in 1931, was the second novel by French writer and aviator Antoine de Saint-Exupéry. It went on to become an international bestseller and a film based on it appeared in 1933. Its popularity, which only grew with the ideological conflicts of the 1930s and 1940s, was due to its master theme of sacrificing personal considerations to a cause in which one believes.

== History ==
The book is based on Saint-Exupéry's experiences as an airmail pilot and as a director of the Aeroposta Argentina airline, based in Buenos Aires. The characters were inspired by the people Saint-Exupéry knew while working in South America. Notably, the character of Rivière was based on the airline's operations director Didier Daurat.

With an introduction by André Gide, the novel of only 23 short chapters was published by Éditions Gallimard in 1931 and was awarded the Prix Femina for that year. In 1932 it was translated into English by Stuart Gilbert as Night Flight and was made a Book of the Month Club choice in the United States. In the following year, Saint-Exupéry's friend Jacques Guerlain used the book's title as the name for his scent Vol de Nuit. The bottle was a blend of glass and metal in Art Deco style with a propeller motif.

In 1933 Metro Goldwyn Mayer adapted the novel very loosely as a film, which brought the author to the attention of a far wider public. In 1979 a short television feature was made by Desmond Davis, titled both Spirit of Adventure and Night Flight.

A contemporary musical adaptation was Luigi Dallapiccola's opera, Volo di notte, begun in 1937 and first performed in 1940. Also in the same decade, American composer Gardner Read was inspired by the novel to compose a short orchestral tone-poem, "Night Flight" (Opus 44, 1936–42). In 2014 the Korean composer Hyukjin Shin (b.1976) wrote another response to the novel in a chamber piece for violin, clarinet, cello, and piano, in this case trying to capture the pilot Fabien's final vision as he flew above the clouds.

== The novel ==
The novel is set in Argentina at the outset of commercial aviation. Rivière is the station chief of an airline that is the first to pioneer night flights, disciplining his employees to focus all they do on ensuring that the mail gets through punctually each night. The novel's episodic structure is built about his work at the Buenos Aires office and the final hours of the pilot Fabien on the Patagonia run. Fabien's plane is caught in a cyclone, runs out of fuel and loses radio contact, while Rivière tries all he can to locate the aircraft. At stake is the future of the night mail-run to Europe. Once the two other flights from Chile and Paraguay get through, Rivière has to allow the trans-Atlantic flight to Paris to depart without the missing mail, resigning himself to Fabien's loss.

The narration is spare and much of the action is presented as a thought or mental perception. The final moments of Fabien are experienced in this way just as he has climbed clear of the clouds:

And now a wonder seized him. Dazzled by that brightness, he had to keep his eyes closed for some seconds. He had never dreamt the night-clouds could dazzle thus. But the full moon and all the constellations were changing them to light.

In a flash, the very instant he had risen clear, the pilot found a peace that passed his understanding. Not a ripple tilted the plane, but like a ship that has crossed the bar, it moved within a tranquil anchorage. In an unknown secret corner of the sky it floated, as in a harbour of the Happy Isles. Below him still the storm was fashioning another world, thridded with squalls and cloudbursts and lightnings, but turning to the stars a face of crystal snow.

Now all grew luminous, his hands, his clothes, the wings, and Fabien thought that he was in a limbo of strange magic; for the light did not come down from the stars but welled up from below, from all that snowy whiteness.

A major theme of the novel is whether doing what is necessary to meet a long-term goal is more important than an individual's life. Rivière wants to show that airmail is more efficient than other means of transport. “It is a matter of life and death for us; for the lead we gain by day on ships and railways is lost at night.” He therefore puts his pilots at risk to establish its commercial viability, but it is a sacrifice that they too readily accept. Drawing on his own experience and that of his fellow-pilots, Saint-Exupéry portrays them as renouncing everything in a cause in which they believe. The relationship between themselves and their employers is not that of slave and master but of man to man: a liberty with as single constraint their submission to duty. In submitting oneself to that absolute, to which all other personal considerations are consciously subordinated, greatness is achieved in one's own eyes and in those of others.

== See also ==
- Courrier sud (Southern Mail), Saint-Exupery's first novel, also concerned with air-mail flights
- "The Aviator," a short story by Saint-Exupery with a similar theme
