= Southern Carrier =

Southern Carrier may refer to:

- Southern Carrier people, see Dakelh
- Southern Carrier (language), a dialect in the Carrier language
- Courrier sud (novel), 1929 novel by Antoine de Saint-Exupéry

== See also ==
- Southern (disambiguation)
- Carrier (disambiguation)
- Courrier sud (disambiguation)
