= Saint-Ex =

1996 film by Anand Tucker

- Film poster
- Based on: The Looters by John H. Reese
- Screenplay by: Frank Cottrell Boyce
- Directed by: Anand Tucker
- Starring: Bruno Ganz; Miranda Richardson; Janet McTeer
- Music by: Barrington Pheloung
- Country of origin: United Kingdom
- Original language: English

Production
- Producer: Jake Lloyd
- Cinematography: David Johnson
- Editor: Peter Webber
- Running time: 82 minutes
- Production companies: British Broadcasting Corporation; Majestic Films International; The Oxford Film Company

Original release
- Network: BBC Two
- Release: 25 December 1996

Saint-Ex is a 1996 British television film, which was released as an episode of the BBC Two TV series Bookmark, after its premiere at the London Film Festival. The story documents the life of French author-aviator Antoine de Saint-Exupéry in the form of a "tone poem". The film was directed by Anand Tucker and stars Bruno Ganz, Miranda Richardson and Janet McTeer. The screenplay was by Frank Cottrell Boyce, while the writer's sons, Aidan and Joseph, portrayed the Saint-Exupéry brothers, François and Antoine, as children.

== Plot ==
Antoine de Saint-Exupéry (Bruno Ganz), growing up in an aristocratic French family, chooses to become a pilot. To the dismay of his family, young Antoine leaves to take a job flying airmail overseas.

Antoine marries beautiful Consuelo (Miranda Richardson), and they set up house in Casablanca. The constant strain on their marriage from his dangerous flights results in Consuelo leaving and going to Paris. Antoine goes after her, they reconcile, but he refuses to give up flying even when he is almost killed when he crashes in an attempt to break the Paris-Saigon air record.

By the late 1930s, Antoine becomes a successful airmail pilot flying in Europe, Africa and South America. During this period, he became a writer, with his most famous work being The Little Prince.

At the outbreak of World War II, Antoine joins the French Air Force (Armée de l'Air), but after France is defeated, he joins the Free French Air Force in North Africa. In July 1944, while flying an Lockheed P-38 Lightning on a reconnaissance mission over the Mediterranean, Antoine mysteriously disappears.

== Cast ==
- Bruno Ganz as Antoine de Saint-Exupéry
- Miranda Richardson as Consuelo de Saint-Exupéry
- Janet McTeer as Genevieve de Ville-Franche
- Ken Stott as Prevost
- Katrin Cartlidge as Gabrielle de Saint-Exupéry
- Brid Brennan as Simone de Saint-Exupéry
- Eleanor Bron as Marie de Saint-Exupéry
- Karl Johnson as Didier Daurat
- Daniel Craig as Guillaumet
- Dominic Rowan as Aeropostal Clerk
- Anna Calder-Marshall as Moisy
- Joe Cottrell Boyce as Young Antoine
- Aidan Cottrell Boyce as Francois
- Nicholas Hewetson as French Pilot
- Alex Kingston as Chic Party Guest

== Production ==
Saint-Ex was filmed and distributed in the United Kingdom. The film was director Anand Tucker's feature film debut, and combines elements of biography, documentary and dramatic re-creation. The use of period documentary interviews in black-and-white is interspersed with live action and optical effects generated on film in colour.

== Reception ==
Saint-Ex was reviewed by Derek Elley for Variety: "Reach falls short of ambition in 'Saint-Ex,' an intriguing attempt to create a cinematic tone-poem to legendary French flyer-cum-novelist Antoine de Saint-Exupéry that only rarely gets both wheels off the ground. Despite some striking visuals and an evident desire to take a fresh look at the biopic genre, the movie remains strangely uninvolving for much of the time and isn't helped by a miscast Bruno Ganz as the titular aviator. Theatrical prospects look fog-bound."
