= Jean Israël =

French Air Force pilot during the Second World War

Jean Israël (1913 – 1995) was a heroic French Air Force pilot during the Second World War, and a key subject in the non-fiction literary work Flight to Arras (Pilote de guerre) written by Antoine de Saint-Exupéry.

In 1940 during the Battle of France, Israël, a French Jew, was called up to service in the same reconnaissance wing in which Antoine de Saint-Exupéry would serve. Israël was shot down and presumed killed during a fierce aerial engagement, but in fact parachuted to safety and was quickly captured by the Germans. He was sent to a German prisoner-of-war camp in Lübeck, where he remained for the duration of the war until the camp's inmates were freed by the Allies.

== Biography ==
Israël met Antoine de Saint-Exupéry in December 1939 after both were assigned to Reconnaissance Group 2/33 which was then flying from a farm field at La Hache Orconte in Champagne-Ardenne. Israël had been a civilian engineer before being called up to serve in the reserves at the start of the Second World War. He had earlier studied at the French Air Force schools in Ambérieu, and then Avord in 1936. When Saint-Exupéry joined the 2/33 Group in December 1939 he befriended several airmen including Francois Laux, Captain Moreau, Hochede Dutertre and Israël. The Jewish pilot had a "big very red and very Jewish nose", as Saint-Exupéry wrote in his work multiple times for reinforcement, in order to denounce the vitriolic antisemitism that the author despised.

During a daring mission on 22 May 1940, Israël's plane was shot down and he was soon captured by the Germans. The author's book, Pilote de guerre, was published in Paris in November 1942 by Editions Gallimard. The collaborationist press, which were allied with the Nazis, despised the book. They initially censored the book and finally it and Saint-Exupéry's other works were banned by the occupation authorities.

When the book was first published, Jean Israël was in a prisoner of war camp in Lübeck, Silesia. This is where he learned of the storm of controversy aroused in France by the mention of his courage in Pilote de guerre, a copy of which was smuggled into the prison camp. In 1944, Israël began his fifth year of captivity in the prison camp when he learned of the death of Antoine de Saint-Exupéry.

Israël later became a Colonel in the French Air Force, and also served as the chief pilot of Air Algérie. The director Robert Enrico created the TV movie Saint-Exupéry: The Last Mission in 1996, for French television (broadcast on France 3). The role of Jean Israël was played by the Arsene Jiroyan.

== Pilote de guerre ==
His friend Saint-Exupéry described him as one of the heroes in Pilote de guerre (Flight to Arras), published in 1942, which made Israël one of France's most famous Jewish pilots.

In Saint-Exupéry's award-winning book we find a passage: in 1939, war was declared and Saint-Exupéry joined the 2/33 Group along with his friends Laux, Gavoille, Israël and Hocheder, and two officers, Dutertre and Moreau. In their improvised airfield they shared a shack covered with corrugated iron.

Saint-Exupéry's book, Flight to Arras used the name of his friend Jean Israël to denounce Nazi anti-Semitism. In the space of two pages of this book, the author mentioned the nose of his Jewish compatriot 14 times. Israël actually had quite an ordinary nose, according to one of Saint-Exupéry's biographers.

The book met with antisemitic hostility among some French as Saint-Exupéry graphically described the heroic deeds of the Jewish member of his squadron. The book was available only illegally in France after it was banned by the collaborationist Vichy authorities to avoid embarrassment to their Nazi occupiers.

Israël learned of the book when a copy of it bearing a false cover was smuggled into his prison, and appreciated the message from his friend Saint-Exupéry. At the beginning of Israël's fifth and final year in prison camp he learned on the evening of August 9, 1944 of the in-flight loss of Saint-Exupéry, which upset him greatly.
