= Campeche (disambiguation) =

Campeche is a Mexican state.

Campeche may also refer to:

== Place names ==
- Campeche Municipality
- Campeche, Campeche
- Campeche (Florianópolis)
- Campeche Bank
- Bay of Campeche a.k.a. the "Campeche Sound"
- Roman Catholic Diocese of Campeche
- Historical settlement on Galveston Island, USA, established by the pirate Jean Lafitte
- Campeche (Mexico City Metrobús), a BRT station in Mexico City

== Other ==
- Campeche catshark
- Campeche Spiny-tailed Iguana
- Campeche Pirates
- José Campeche
- Haematoxylum campechianum campeche wood.
