= Courrier sud =

Courrier sud may refer to:

- Courrier sud (novel), a 1929 novel by Antoine de Saint-Exupery
- Courrier sud (film), a 1937 film directed by Pierre Billon

== See also ==
- Le Courrier du Sud, French-language newspaper in Quebec, Canada
- Southern Mail (disambiguation)
