= Volo di notte =

Opera by Luigi Dallapiccola

- Opera by Luigi Dallapiccola
- Translation: Night Flight
- Librettist: Dallapiccola
- Language: Italian
- Based on: Vol de nuit by Antoine de Saint-Exupéry
- Premiere: May 10, 1940; Teatro della Pergola, Florence

Volo di notte (Night Flight) is a one-act opera composed by Luigi Dallapiccola to an Italian libretto he wrote based on the novel Vol de nuit by Antoine de Saint-Exupéry. It was first performed at the Teatro della Pergola in Florence on May 18, 1940.

The opera emphasizes individual suffering and was written as a response to the rise of fascism.

== Roles ==
- First employee (tenor)
- Second employee (baritone)
- Third employee (tenor)
- Fourth employee (baritone)
- Leroux, a pilot (bass)
- Pellerin, a pilot (tenor)
- Radio operator (tenor)
- Rivière, the airfield director (bass-baritone)
- Robineau, an inspector (bass)
- Simona Fabien, wife of a pilot (mezzo-soprano)

== Synopsis ==
The subject is an individual aviator, an Argentine long-distance mail carrier, during the early days of flying. He is caught in a storm, with no way to land. The ensuing drama occurs both within his family, anxious for his safe return, and among his employers, concerned both for his safe return and the success of their enterprise.
