= Flight to Arras =

1942 book by Antoine de Saint-Exupery

- First US edition (publ. Reynal & Hitchcock)
- Author: Antoine de Saint-Exupéry
- Original title: Pilote de guerre
- Translator: Lewis Galantière
- Language: French
- Publication date: 1942

Flight to Arras (French: Pilote de guerre) is a memoir by French author Antoine de Saint-Exupéry. Written in 1942, it recounts his role in the Armée de l'Air (French Air Force) as pilot of a reconnaissance plane during the Battle of France in 1940.

The book condenses months of flights into a single, terrifying mission over the town of Arras. Saint-Exupéry was assigned to Reconnaissance Group II/33 flying the twin-engine Bloch MB.170. At the start of the war there were only fifty reconnaissance crews, of which twenty-three were in his unit. Within the first few days of the German invasion of France in May 1940, seventeen of the II/33 crews were sacrificed recklessly, he writes, "like glasses of water thrown onto a forest fire".

Saint-Exupéry survived the French defeat but refused to join the Royal Air Force over political differences with Charles de Gaulle, and in late 1940, went to New York where he accepted the National Book Award for Wind, Sand and Stars. He remained in North America for two years, and then in the spring of 1943 rejoined his old unit in North Africa. In July 1944, "risking flesh to prove good faith", he failed to return from a reconnaissance mission over France.

This work was adapted as a radio drama for American audiences by the NBC Red Network and broadcast on 7 October 1942 at the Author's Playhouse.

The work was later adapted, by Rod Wooden, in 1998 as a radio drama by BBC Radio 4, with David Threlfall playing the role of the pilot.
