= Night Flight (1933 film) =

1933 film by Clarence Brown

- Theatrical release poster
- Directed by: Clarence Brown
- Screenplay by: Oliver H.P. Garrett; John Monk Saunders
- Based on: Vol de nuit 1931 novel by Antoine de Saint-Exupéry
- Produced by: David O. Selznick
- Starring: John Barrymore; Lionel Barrymore; Clark Gable; Helen Hayes; Robert Montgomery; Myrna Loy
- Cinematography: Elmer Dyer; Charles A. Marshall; Oliver T. Marsh
- Edited by: Hal C. Kern
- Music by: Herbert Stothart; Charles Maxwell (orchestrator)
- Production company: Metro-Goldwyn-Mayer
- Distributed by: Loew's Inc.
- Release date: October 6, 1933
- Running time: 84 minutes
- Country: United States
- Language: English
- Budget: $499,000
- Box office: $1 million

Night Flight (also known as Dark to Dawn) is a 1933 American pre-Code aviation drama film produced by David O. Selznick, distributed by Metro-Goldwyn-Mayer, directed by Clarence Brown and starring John Barrymore, Lionel Barrymore, Clark Gable, Helen Hayes, Robert Montgomery and Myrna Loy.

The picture is based on the 1931 novel of the same name, which won the Prix Femina the same year, by French writer and pioneering aviator Antoine de Saint-Exupéry. (Note: During World War II, Count Antoine de Saint-Exupéry took to writing his name with a hyphenated last name; prior to that period, only his literary works had this form.) Based on Saint-Exupéry's personal experiences while flying on South American mail routes, Night Flight recreates a 24-hour period of the operations of a fictional airline based on Aéropostale, Trans-Andean European Air Mail. (Note: The film adaptation of Night Flight (originally Vol de nuit) was the first of Saint-Exupéry's novels to be adapted for the screen.)

In 1942, Night Flight was withdrawn from circulation as a result of a legal dispute between MGM and Saint Exupéry. The film was unavailable for 69 years and could not be seen until 2011, when the legal obstacles were finally settled.

== Plot ==
In South America, the daunting mountains and dangerous weather have hampered the operations of Trans-Andean European Air Mail, a 1930s-era airline. Charged with delivering a serum to stem an outbreak of infantile paralysis in Rio de Janeiro, Auguste Pellerin conquers his fears, but is reprimanded by the airline's stern director, A. Rivière for coming in late.

Determined to make the night flight program work, Rivière sends pilot Jules Fabian and his wireless operator on another dangerous flight. The pair are caught in a torrential rain storm and when Madame Fabian comes to the headquarters, she realizes that her husband is overdue. The two airmen, flying blind over the ocean, run out of fuel and choose to jump, but drown.

Rivière refuses to quit and orders a Brazilian pilot to take the mail to Rio, but the pilot's wife pleads with him not to go. Despite the dangers, the night mail is delivered on time. The pilot despairs that his flight only meant that someone in Paris can get a postcard on Tuesday instead of Thursday, but its real value is proven when the serum is also delivered and a child is saved. The mother weeps for joy at her child's bedside, and the scene dissolves to two parachutes floating on the ocean. A ghostly plane appears with Fabian, smiling, at the controls. He soars up into the sky, followed by a host of phantom biplanes; the following words appear on screen: "And such is human courage...that men died...so others might live...and so, at last, man's empire might reach triumphant to the sky!"

== Cast ==
- John Barrymore as Managing Director A. Rivière
- Helen Hayes as Madame Fabian
- Clark Gable as Jules Fabian
- Lionel Barrymore as Inspector Robineau
- Robert Montgomery as Auguste Pellerin
- Myrna Loy as Brazilian Pilot's Wife
- William Gargan as Brazilian Pilot
- C. Henry Gordon as Daudet
- Leslie Fenton as Fabian's Radio Operator
- Harry Beresford as Roblet
- Frank Conroy as Radio Operator
- Dorothy Burgess as Pellerin's Girlfriend
- Irving Pichel as Dr. Decosta
- Helen Jerome Eddy as Worried Mother
- Buster Phelps as Sick Child
- Ralf Harolde as Pilot
- Marcia Ralston as Nightclub Vamp
- Otto Hoffman as Airport Office Clerk (uncredited)

== Production ==
#24, the Curtiss (Falcon) Liberty Mailplane aircraft piloted by Auguste Pellerin.

Saint Exupéry's Vol de nuit, based on real-life events in South America, had won the 1931 Prix Femina, one of the main French literary prizes (awarded by a female jury). Prior to this award, he had been little known outside of the literary sphere, but as a result of the prize, received widespread recognition and attention from Hollywood.

Selznick realized that Oliver H. P. Garrett's original treatment was too heavily based on "the ground" and brought in John Monk Saunders, who had worked with him on The Dawn Patrol (1930), to add more flying scenes. Director Clarence Brown was dissatisfied with that version, so Selznick finally called on writer Wells Root to tighten up the final draft. Brown also was interested in an accurate portrayal of aviation, as he had been a World War I pilot. Night Flight utilized both studio and location shooting with the mountainous region around Denver, Colorado, filling in for the South American Andes. The recently retired U.S. Mail Douglas M-4 mail planes were featured as the Trans-Andean European Air Mail's primary aircraft.

Clarence Brown and John Barrymore had a disagreeable relationship during the film's shooting, as Barrymore was imbibing during filming and reading from cue cards. Brown wanted to replace Barrymore, but was not allowed to, being overruled by studio head Louis B. Mayer. Helen Hayes also felt intimidated by Barrymore. When they filmed their scene together, Barrymore refrained from relying on cue cards, because he said that he didn't want to use a crutch in the presence of a real actress. Later, Hayes remarked that Barrymore's explanation was the greatest review that she ever received.

== Reception ==
MGM's choice of an all-star cast was intended to elevate Night Flight to epic status. The film, however, was sequenced in episodic style with many of the scenes concentrating on one of the sub-plots; Gable's scenes, for example, featured his fateful last flight, primarily filmed in the cockpit without spoken dialog. Most of the sequences were filmed in isolation with little interaction between the lead actors. Although premiered in a longer two-hour version, the final film was received favorably by critics. The New York Times review called it "a vivid and engrossing production." In a similar vein, Variety considered Night Flight, "a competently done saga".

Smarting from some critics' reviews of his novel, and professing that he hated the film adaptation, Saint Exupéry refused to renew his author's rights, which he had granted to MGM only for a 10-year period. In 1942, Night Flight was pulled from circulation when MGM's agreement with Saint Exupéry expired. (Note: On July 31, 1944, Saint Exupéry disappeared over the Mediterranean while flying for the Armée de l'Air (French Air Force) and was believed to have died at that time.)

Following its first public showing at the 2011 TCM Classic Film Festival, a first-time home video of the picture was released on DVD on June 7, 2011, over 75 years after its original release. The movie's world television premiere was on TCM on August 10, 2012.

=== Box office ===
According to MGM records, Night Flight earned $576,000 in the U.S. and Canada and $503,000 elsewhere, resulting in a profit of $176,000. The film was a box office disappointment for MGM.

== See also ==
- Only Angels Have Wings
