= A Sense of Life =

1956 book by Antoine de Saint-Exupéry

First English edition (publ. Funk & Wagnalls)

A Sense of Life is the 1965 English translation of Un Sens à la Vie, by the French writer, poet and pioneering aviator, Antoine de Saint-Exupéry. The original French compilation was published posthumously in 1956 by Editions Gallimard and translated into English by Adrienne Foulke, with an introduction by Claude Reynal. Saint-Exupéry was killed during the Second World War while flying for the Free French Air Force. (Note: The last paragraph of Flying's book review of A Sense Of Life incorrectly states that Saint-Exupéry's last mission was a bombing run, when it was a photo-reconnaissance assignment for the pending invasion of Southern France.)

The book is a chronological anthology of Saint-Exupéry's writings, ranging from an excerpt from his very earliest successful story, L'Évasion de Jacques Bernis, published by Jean Prévost as The Aviator, through his news dispatches from Moscow and the front lines of the Spanish Civil War, to the center-pieces of his most philosophical writings, to his last Letter to General X written shortly before Saint-Exupéry's death. Also included is his Open Letter To Frenchmen Everywhere, extolling unity among Frenchmen worldwide after the Fall of France.

The book showcases a wide variety of the author-aviator's writings and writing styles throughout his entire career.
