= Southern Mail =

Southern Mail may refer to:

- Courrier sud (novel), 1929 novel by Antoine de Saint-Exupery
- Courrier sud (film), 1937 film directed by Pierre Billon
- Southern Mail (newspaper), newspaper in Cape Town, South Africa
- The Southern Mail, a newspaper in Bowral, New South Wales
