= Terre des Hommes =

Terre des hommes or Terre des Hommes (literally: land of men, or land of people) may refer to:

- Terre des hommes (English title Wind, Sand and Stars), a 1939 philosophical memoir by French writer and aviator Antoine de Saint-Exupéry
- Terre des hommes, a charitable international humanitarian organization based in Lausanne, Geneva and Basel
- Terre des Hommes, the central theme of the 1967 international exposition in Montreal, Canada, Expo 67
- Terre des Hommes, an annual seasonal fair held for several years in Montreal, Canada after the conclusion of the Expo 67 international World's Fair
- Terre des hommes (album), an album by Mitsou
