= Le Navire d'Argent =

Named after the ship in Paris's coat of arms

Le Navire d'Argent (The Silver Ship) was a short lived but influential literary review, published monthly in Paris from June 1925 until May 1926. It was "French in language, but international in spirit".

Founded by Adrienne Monnier, with Sylvia Beach's help and support, Jean Prévost was editor. It took its name from the silver sailing ship, which appears in Paris's coat of arms. With a cover price of 5Fr per issue, it cost 50Fr for a twelve-month subscription.

Although financially unsuccessful, it was an important part of the literary scene of the Twenties and helped launch the careers of several writers from the Lost Generation. It contained the first French-language translation of T. S. Eliot's poem, The Love Song of J. Alfred Prufrock (May 1925); an early draft of part of James Joyce's Finnegans Wake (Oct 1925); and an abridged version of Antoine de Saint-Exupéry's novella, The Aviator in the penultimate (Apr 1926) issue. One issue (Mar 1926) was devoted to American writers (including Walt Whitman, William Carlos Williams and E. E. Cummings). It also first introduced Ernest Hemingway in translation to French audiences. Monnier herself contributed under the pseudonym, J-M Sollier, based on her mother's maiden name.

After publication ceased, in May 1926, Monnier was forced to auction her personal collection of 400 books, many inscribed to her by their authors, to cover the losses. It was eventually succeeded by the Gazette des Amis des Livres (Jan 1938-May 1940), also under Monnier's overall direction.

== Issues ==
Issue	Date	Vol	Pages	Contributors/content
1	Jun 1925	I	1–128	Valery Larbaud; T. S. Eliot's poem, The Love Song of J. Alfred Prufrock
2	Jul 1925	I	132–256	
3	Aug 1925	I	260–368	
4	Sep 1925	I	370–463	Dedicated to William Blake, with translations by Auguste Morel. Also material by Swinburne, Arthur Symons, Marcel Brion.
5	Oct 1925	II		An early draft of part of James Joyce's Finnegans Wake
6	Nov 1925	II		
7	Dec 1925	II		Washington Irving
8	Jan 1926	II	379–504	
9	Feb 1926	III		
10	Mar 1926	III		Dedicated entirely to American writers (including Walt Whitman, William Carlos Williams, E. E. Cummings and Ernest Hemingway)
11	Apr 1926	III		Antoine de Saint-Exupéry's novella, The Aviator
12	May 1926	III		Alfonso Reyes, D.H. Lawrence, previously unpublished extract from Goethe's Faust
