= Lewis Galantière =

American translator (1895–1977)

- Born: October 10, 1895
- Died: February 20, 1977 (aged 81)
- Occupations: translator and official
- Known for: friendships with the "Lost Generation"

Lewis Galantière (October 10, 1895 – February 20, 1977) was a noted American translator, man of letters, and sometime government official. He is particularly remembered for his friendships with the "Lost Generation" American expatriate writers in Paris.

== Early life ==
Galantière was born in a tenement room in Chicago's Jewish section. Both parents were immigrants from Riga, Latvia; they earned their living making cigars and cigarettes in the room. His schooling in the Chicago settlement house movement was excellent, and by his teens he had learned French and read widely in European 18th- and 19th-century authors. In 1908 his family moved to Los Angeles, and his basic education ended then. He was 13 years old. His first job was as a clerk for the Santa Fe Railroad, where he continued to read French, English, and German literature. In 1910 he became a salesman at the Andrews Talking Machine Company, which led to an invitation to join the Union League Club. There he learned the manners of the educated and successful. He attended the University of Southern California law school during the summer of 1911, but did not continue, and in 1914 was accepted into the Librarian Training Program offered by the Los Angeles Public Library. His year in the training program formed the entirety of his advanced education in literature.

Degree in hand, Galantière returned to Chicago to join Kroch's bookstore as a salesman. Through the store he became friends with Sherwood Anderson, Ben Hecht, Carl Sandburg, and other aspiring authors. In early 1918, however, he left the bookstore, and returned to live with his parents in Los Angeles. After his father's death, Galantière became a librarian first at the San Diego Library, and subsequently with military libraries, during which time he began to publish a number of book reviews in newspapers and magazines including The Dial and The New Republic. By a chance meeting, he was invited to become assistant to the American Commission to the newly created International Chamber of Commerce (ICC) in Paris, where he arrived in late 1920.

== Paris days ==
When Sherwood Anderson and his wife arrived at Paris in May 1921, Galantière introduced them to Sylvia Beach, James Joyce, and Ezra Pound. Later that year, Galantière would become acquainted with a young Ernest Hemingway and his wife Hadley shortly after their arrival in late December. Anderson, who had met Hemingway earlier in Chicago, had written the young writer a letter of introduction to Galantière. Clearly Lewis Galantière was on excellent terms with the literary community in Paris, for when Joyce's Ulysses was issued on the writer's birthday, but only two copies could be printed at that time, Joyce inscribed one to his wife, the other to Galantière. During the next few years, Galantière supplemented his ICC salary by publishing reviews and translations of Jean Cocteau (The Grand Ecarte and Thomas the Imposter).

When his ICC work drew to a close in 1926, Galantière returned to New York City, where he earned a meager living as a translator of Remy de Gourmont, Leon Daudet, Paul Morand, Jean Maurice Pouquet, Raymond Escholier, and Jakob Wassermann. Almost miraculously, however, in February 1928 he was offered a job in Paris with the Federal Reserve Bank of New York. He accepted and returned to Paris.

Through his job, Galantière met John Houseman, then a grain trader. After the stock market crash in 1929, Houseman invited Galantière to join him in authoring a comedy – Lovers, Happy Lovers – based on Sacha Guitry's L'Illusioniste. It was a modest success, and they subsequently collaborated on adapting a French farce, Trois et une, for Broadway. Galantière's introduction to Virgil Thomson led to Houseman's role in producing Four Saints in Three Acts, and onwards to a career in show business.

Galantière remained at the bank until February 1939, performing translations on the side. The most celebrated was his book of excerpts from the Goncourt Journal, published in 1937. He also organized and translated Wind, Sand, and Stars by Antoine de Saint-Exupéry, which won that year's National Book Award for nonfiction.

== War years ==
Back in New York, Galantière worked with Saint-Exupéry to create the English-language Flight to Arms. When the Office of War Information was created, Galantière was asked to lead the French section, where he oversaw the French transmissions of the Voice of America. In 1942, he was very nearly killed in an aviation accident offshore from Botwood, Nova Scotia; that accident and its consequences kept him out of commission for much of a year. However, in February 1944 he flew to London where he led the French section of the American Broadcasting Station in Europe. As Allied forces landed in France, and made their push to Paris, Galantière followed in a public announcement truck, providing news to the freshly liberated villages. By late 1945, he had returned to New York, where he adapted the play Antigone by Jean Anouilh; but it was only a modest success.

== Postwar years ==
After the war, Galantière continued to translate French writers, including Voltaire and Jacques Maritain. In March 1949 he joined a new magazine, The Reporter, founded by Max Ascoli and James Reston, but resigned after four months. In 1950 he became a part-time advisory to Radio Free Europe, and subsequently joined the Council on Foreign Relations. In 1951 he became a consultant to the State Department, and apparently continued in these dual roles until 1965. At about that time, he was named president of PEN America, in which role he served admirably until 1967. He also served as director of the American Civil Liberties Union, the Authors League of America, and the American Translators Association, and was awarded the French Order of Arts and Letters. After his wife's death in 1969, Galantière moved to a smaller apartment in The Dakota. In his twilight years, he spent the majority of time in his apartment, and taking lunches at the Century Association. After his death, he was buried in the Emanuel Synagogue cemetery in Wethersfield, Connecticut.

== Discrepancies in his life story ==
Galantière's version of his upbringing diverged from the actual facts. As early as his librarian training course, he had described himself as having studied "one year University of Chicago," though the university has no such record of him. By 1919, he wrote in a letter that he was reading Homer and Sophocles in the original Greek, with his father's notes, and mentioned the "concentrated reading of the Greeks in his father's company". By the time he joined Radio Free Europe, he listed his upbringing in Azerbaijan from 1895 to 1901, elementary school in Paris and at Downside Abbey, Bath, England, high school in the Lycée Condorcet in Paris, and a bachelor's degree from the University of Paris in 1915.
