= Campeche, Florianópolis =

Beach in Santa Catarina, Brazil

Coordinates: 27°40′59″S 48°29′30″W

Campeche
- Neighbourhood
- Municipality of Florianópolis - Distrito de Campeche
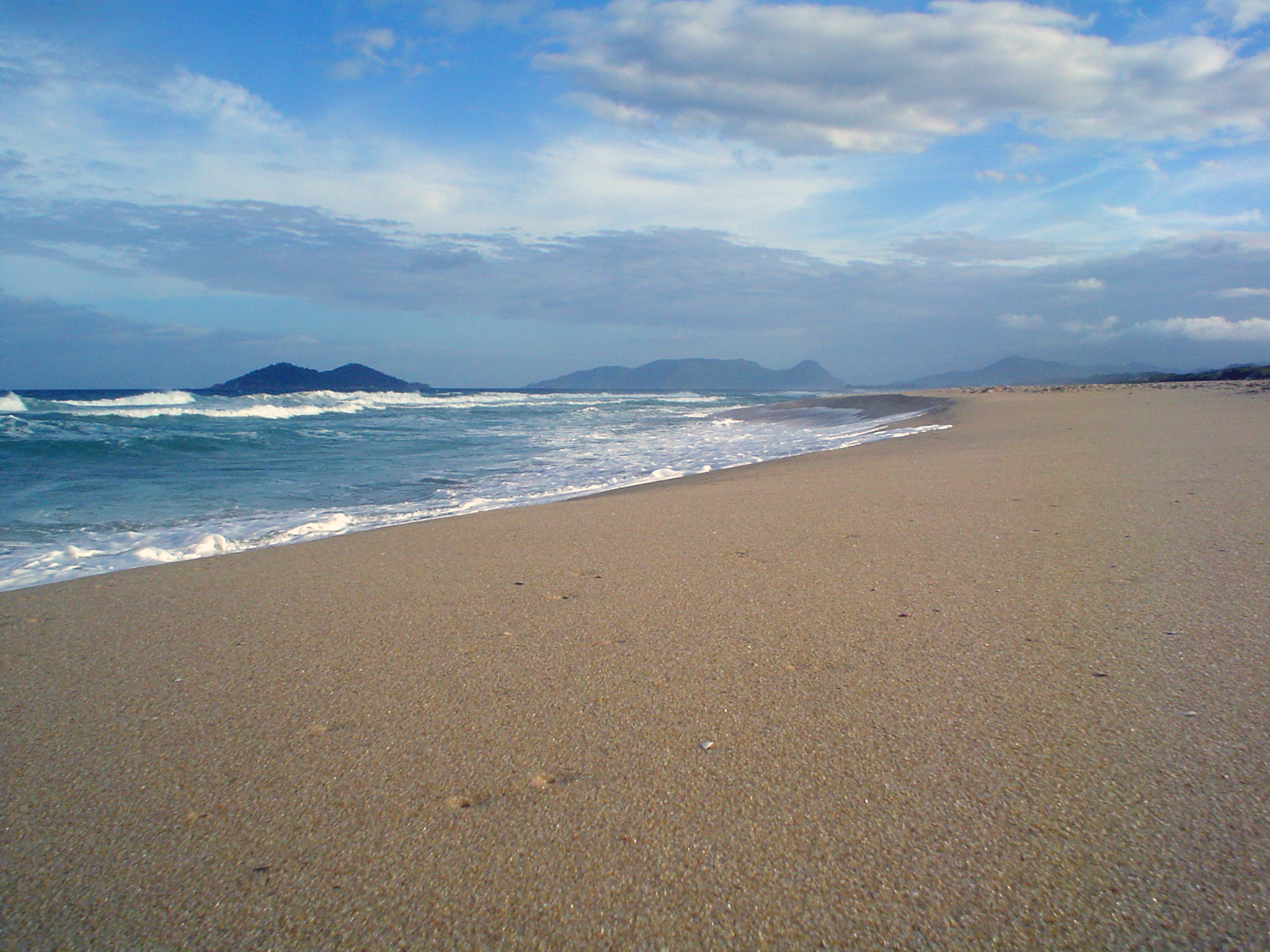
- View of Campeche Beach, Florianópolis
- Interactive map of Campeche
- Country: Brazil
- Region: South
- State: Santa Catarina (Brasil)

Area
  - Total: 35.32 km^{2} (13.64 sq mi)

Population (2000)
  - Total: 18,570
  - Density: 525.8/km^{2} (1,362/sq mi)
- Website: Florianópolis, Santa Catarina

Campeche is a beach located on the south of the city of Florianópolis, on the south of Brazil.

There used to be a proper airport which was inaugurated in 1927 by the French Compagnie générale aéropostale. Aéropostale's planes used to land on it. It is plausible that the famous French pilot and writer Antoine de Saint-Exupéry, author of the classic The Little Prince, would have made a few landings on the area after the death of the pilot Élysée Négrin in 1930, while he was in charge of controlling the flights of Aeroposta Argentina.

There are many houses to rent as well as pousadas (hostels), bars and simple restaurants. From any point along its 11.5 kilometres (7.1 mi) length, the island of Campeche can be seen.
