= Jean Prévost =

French writer, journalist and Resistance fighter

Jean Prévost (French: [ʒɑ̃ pʁevo]; 13 June 1901 – 1 August 1944) was a French writer, journalist, and Resistance fighter.

== Biography ==
Born in Saint-Pierre-lès-Nemours, Prévost was educated (from 1907 to 1911) at the primary school in Montivilliers. near Rouen, where his father was principal. In 1911, he moved to the prestidigious Lycée Pierre Corneille in Rouen. In 1918, he transferred to the lycée Henri-IV in Paris, where he studied under the philosopher Alain, to prepare for his entry to the École normale supérieure, in 1919.

In 1926 he married Marcelle Auclair with whom he had three children (Michel, Françoise and Alain). They divorced in 1939.

In June 1925, Adrienne Monnier launched a French language review, Le Navire d'Argent, and invited Prévost to be its literary editor. Le Navire d'Argent was international in its scope and published American works in translation as well as devoting an issue (March 1926) to American writers including Walt Whitman, William Carlos Williams and E. E. Cummings. It also first introduced Ernest Hemingway in translation to French audiences. Prévost was the first to commission a work from Antoine de Saint-Exupéry, publishing The Aviator in the review's eleventh issue. After twelve issues, the project had to be abandoned as the effort and the cost was more than Monnier could bear.

At the beginning of World War II, he was mobilized and assigned to telephone control at Le Havre. After his first marriage ended, he married Claude Van Biema, a doctor. He was evacuated by sea to Casablanca and returned to France later.

== French Resistance Member ==
He joined the underground National Committee of Writers, created by Louis Aragon and his wife, and took part in the creation of the clandestine newspaper Les Étoiles at the end of 1942. He wrote a doctoral thesis: La création chez Stendhal, essai sur le métier d'écrire et la psychologie de l'écrivain (Creativity in Stendhal, essay on the craft of writing and the psychology of the writer), which won the grand prize for literature of the Académie française in 1943.

He was a Resistance fighter under the name of Captaine Goderville (the village where his father was from). Biographer Jérôme Garcin writes that Prévost fought with "a gun in his hand and a knife in his pocket and, in his backpack, the unfinished manuscript of his Baudelaire together with a portable typewriter". He was killed in a German ambush at the Pont Charvet, in Sassenage, on 1 August 1944.

The lycées (secondary schools) in Villard-de-Lans and Montivilliers are named in his honor.

== Literary works ==
- Plaisirs des sports, 1925;
- Dix-huitième année, 1928;
- Les frères Bouquinquant, 1930;
- Vie de Montaigne, essai, 1931
- Histoire de la France depuis la guerre, 1932;
- Le sel sur la plaie, roman, 1934;
- La chasse du matin, roman, 1937;
- Lucie-Paulette, 1935;
- La Terre est aux hommes, 1936;
- Usonie, esquisse de la civilisation américaine, 1939;
- Beaudelaire, essai, 1953.

== Notes and sources ==
Notes

Sources

- This article began as a translation of its French equivalent.
- Fitch, Noel Riley (1985). Sylvia Beach and the Lost Generation: A History of Literary Paris in the Twenties & Thirties. New York & London: W. W. Norton. ISBN 978-0-393-30231-8.
- Garcin, Jérôme (1994). Pour Jean Prévost (in French). Paris: Gallimard. ISBN 978-2-07-041017-0.
- Lefebvre, Lucien (1 February 2006). "Histoire de Jean Prevost l'homme" [History of Jean Prévost, the man] (in French). Lycée Jean Prévost, Montivilliers. Archived from the original on 4 March 2016.
- Prévost, Michel (2002). Retrouver Jean Prévost (in French). Grenoble, France: Presse Universitaire Grenoble. ISBN 978-2-7061-1048-1.
- Schiff, Stacy (2006) [1994]. Saint-Exupéry: A biography. New York: Henry Holt. ISBN 978-0-8050-7913-5.
