= Wind, Sand and Stars =

1939 memoir by de Saint-Exupéry

- First U.S. edition cover
- Author: Antoine de Saint-Exupéry
- Original title: Terre des hommes
- Translator: Lewis Galantière
- Language: French
- Genre: Memoir
- Publisher: Reynal and Hitchcock
- Publication date: February 1939
- Publication place: France

Wind, Sand and Stars (French title: Terre des hommes, literally "Land of Men") is a memoir by the French aristocrat aviator-writer Antoine de Saint-Exupéry, and a winner of several literary awards. It was first published in France in February 1939, and was then translated by Lewis Galantière and published in English by Reynal and Hitchcock in the United States later the same year.

The book's themes deal with friendship, death, heroism, camaraderie and solidarity among colleagues, humanity and the search for meaning in life. The book illustrates the author's view of the world and his opinions of what makes life worth living.

The central incident he wrote of detailed his 1935 plane crash in the Sahara Desert between Benghazi and Cairo, which he barely survived along with his mechanic-navigator, André Prévot. Saint-Exupéry and his navigator were left almost completely without water and food, and as the chances of finding an oasis or help from the air gradually decreased, the two men nearly died of thirst before they were saved by a Bedouin on a camel.

Wind, Sand and Stars also provided storylines for his book Le Petit Prince with many of the same themes outlined above, particularly camaraderie and friendship.

== Publication history ==
The book was first published in France in February 1939, and was then translated by Lewis Galantière and published in English by Reynal and Hitchcock in the United States later the same year. The French and English versions of this book differed significantly; Saint-Exupéry removed sections from the original French version he considered inappropriate for its targeted U.S. audience, and added new material specifically written for them, and Lewis Galantière translated the revised book into English. Although it did not appear in the earliest editions of its English translation, "An Appreciation" was added to later printings, contributed by Anne Morrow Lindbergh and earlier published in The Saturday Review of Literature on 14 October 1939.

Saint-Exupéry struggled to find a title for his book; the original working title was: "Etoiles par grand vent" (literally: 'Stars in windy conditions'). He even promised 100 francs to André de Fonscolombe, his cousin, if André could come up with 'the perfect title'. His cousin returned the day after with a list of 30 suggestions, and Saint-Exupéry chose one of them: "Terre des Humains" (literally: 'Land of humans'), which later became 'Terre des hommes' ('Land of men'). Lewis Galantière came up with the English title, which was approved by Saint-Exupéry.

Saint-Exupéry dedicated the book to his friend Henri Guillaumet of Aéropostale.

== Tributes ==
The charity Terre des hommes took its name from this book in 1959. The charitable international federation of humanitarian societies concentrates on children's rights, and is based in Lausanne, Switzerland.

The book's title was subsequently used to create the central theme ("Terre des Hommes – Man and His World") of the most successful world's fair of the 20th century, Expo 67, in Montreal, Quebec, Canada. In 1963, a group of prominent Canadians met for three days at the Seigneury Club in Montebello, Quebec. In an introduction to the Expo 67 Corporation's book, also entitled "Terre des Hommes/Man and His World", Gabrielle Roy wrote:

In Terre des Hommes, his haunting book, so filled with dreams and hopes for the future, Antoine de Saint-Exupéry writes of how deeply moved he was when, flying for the first time by night alone over Argentina, he happened to notice a few flickering lights scattered below him across an almost empty plain. They "twinkled here and there, alone like stars."

.... In truth, being made aware of our own solitude can give us insight into the solitude of others. It can even cause us to gravitate towards one another as if to lessen our distress. Without this inevitable solitude, would there be any fusion at all, any tenderness between human beings.

Moved as he was by a heightened awareness of the solitude of all creation and by the human need for solidarity, Saint-Exupéry found a phrase to express his anguish and his hope that was as simple as it was rich in meaning; and because that phrase was chosen many years later to be the governing idea of Expo 67, a group of people from all walks of life was invited by the Corporation to reflect upon it and to see how it could be given tangible form.

Pascal Gélinas & Pierre Harel's short film Taire des hommes (meaning to silence men) has a title homophonic to the book's title, but is instead about the censorship and repression at the riot of the national holiday of June 24, 1968, in downtown Montréal, one day before the federal election.

== Awards and recognitions ==
- Winner of the Grand Prix du roman de l'Académie française (Grand Prize for Fiction from the French Academy), 1939, one of France's oldest and most prestigious literary awards.
- Winner of the U.S. National Book Award for 1939 Nonfiction. Saint-Exupéry only received the prize in early 1942, as he had been flying as a reconnaissance pilot during the Battle of France when the award was announced earlier. (Note: Non-American authors were eligible for the U.S. "national" awards before the war and authors from France and the British Isles won five of twelve awards in the general nonfiction and fiction categories.)
- The National Geographic ADVENTURE voted the book No. 3 in its all-time list of 100 best adventure-exploration books.
- Outside magazine voted the book No. 1 in its all-time list of 25 adventure-explorer books.
