= Southern Mail (newspaper) =

The Southern Mail is a local newspaper from the South Peninsula region of Cape Town, Western Cape, South Africa.
