= The Aviator (short story) =

1926 short story by Antoine de Saint-Exupéry

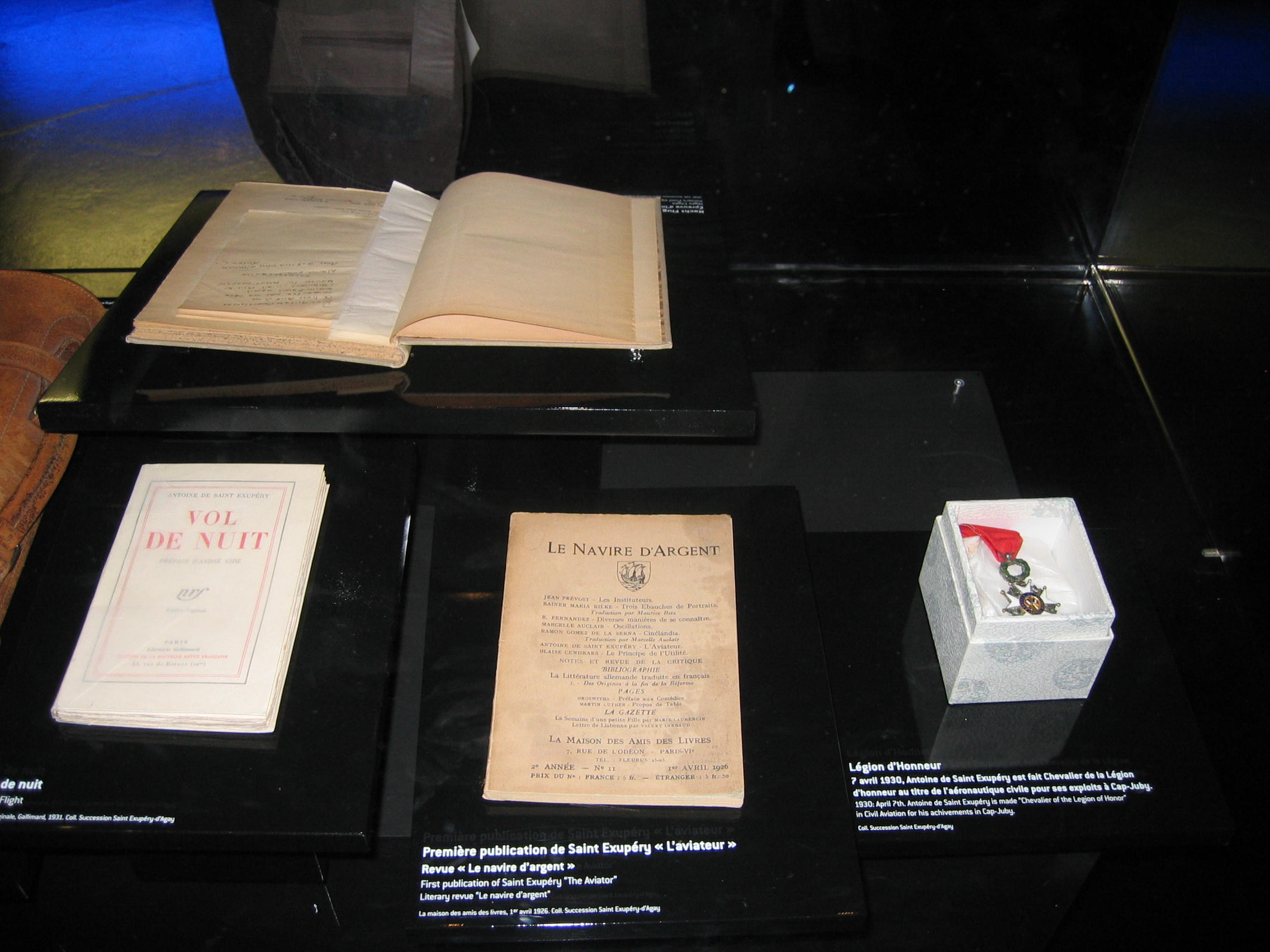
"The Aviator" (L'Aviateur), as published originally in French in April 1926 in the literary magazine, Le Navire d'Argent (The Silver Ship), shown at lower centre.

"The Aviator" is the 1965 English translation of a short story, L'Aviateur, by the French aristocrat writer, poet and pioneering aviator, Antoine de Saint-Exupéry (29 June 1900 – 31 July 1944, Mort pour la France). (Note: Although Saint-Exupéry inherited his peerage title through his father and it could be employed at will, he rarely ever did so. While stationed out of country he asked his mother to no longer address him as 'Count' on her mail envelopes to him. He would later write "I have worked eight years of my life, day and night, with working men. I have found myself sharing their table.... I know very well what I am talking about when I speak of working-class people, and I love them.") (Note: According to French legal documents and his birth certificate, no hyphen is used in his name, thus written de Saint Exupéry, not Saint-Exupéry. The Armorial de l'ANF, which lists the French nobility, mentions the Saint Exupéry (de) family without a hyphen. However all his books were published under his name with a hyphen, which technically makes it a pseudonym. Memorial plaques, the 50-franc banknote, the bracelet he was wearing at the time of his death also use the hyphen (Saint-Exupéry). It was after his arrival in the United States in 1941 that the author adopted the hyphen within his surname, as he was annoyed with Americans addressing him as "Mr. Exupéry".) (Note: Mort pour la France (Died for France) is a French civil code designation applied by the French Government to fallen or gravely injured armed forces personnel. The designation was applied to Saint-Exupéry's estate in 1948. Amongst the law's provisions is an increase of 30 years in the copyright duration of creative works; thus most of Saint-Exupéry's literary and other works will not fall out of copyright status for an extra 30 years in France.)

The original story (L'Aviateur) upon which the translation was based was Saint-Exupéry's first published work. L'Aviateur was excerpted from a longer unpublished manuscript, L'Évasion de Jacques Bernis (The Escape of Jacques Bernis). L'Aviateur was released in April 1926 in its excerpted form by editor Jean Prévost. It was published by Adrienne Monnier in the eleventh issue of the short-lived French literary magazine Le Navire d'Argent (The Silver Ship), after Saint-Exupéry rewrote L'Évasion de Jacques Bernis from memory, having lost his original manuscript. (Note: The last paragraph of Flying's book review of A Sense Of Life incorrectly states that Saint-Exupéry's last mission was a bombing run, when in fact it was a photo-reconnaissance assignment for the pending invasion of Southern France.)

Saint-Exupéry was killed during the Second World War while flying with the Free French Air Force. The work's editor, Jean Prévost, was killed only one day after Saint-Exupéry, while serving in the French Resistance.

The Aviator appears as the first chapter in the Saint-Exupéry anthology, Un Sens à la Vie (A Sense of Life). The original French compilation was published posthumously in 1956 by Editions Gallimard, and translated into English by Adrienne Foulke. The story recounts various episodes in the life of the fictional French flyer, Jacques Bernis, from his early experiences as an aviator to his work as a flying instructor, to his last flight when the wing of his monoplane shatters during an aerobatic maneuver. The work is an example of Saint-Exupéry's formative writing style which would evolve into the more evocative, winning form he would later become famous for.

In his short work the author uses picturesque metaphors, for example comparing the propeller wash flowing backwards like a river in his description of the movements of the grass behind an airplane: "Battue par le vent de l'hélice, l'herbe jusqu'à vingt mètres en arrière semble couler". (Beaten up by the wind from the propeller, the grass up to twenty meters behind seems to flow), as well as his descriptions of the physical sensation of the air becoming solid: "Il regarde le capot noir appuyé sur le ciel" (He looks at the black hood, leaning against the sky).

In a short foreword to the story, Jean Prévost wrote: "I met [Saint-Exupéry] at the home of friends and greatly admired his vigor and finesse in describing his impressions as a pilot.... He has a gift for directness and truth that seems to me amazing in a beginning writer".
