= Antoine de Saint-Exupéry =

French writer and aviator (1900–1944)

- Saint-Exupéry in 1920
- Born: Antoine Marie Jean-Baptiste Roger de Saint-Exupéry; 29 June 1900; Lyon, France
- Died: 31 July 1944 (aged 44); Mediterranean Sea, off Marseille, France
- Education: Villa St. Jean International School
- Occupations: Aviator, writer
- Spouse: Consuelo Suncín de Sandoval (m. 1931)
- Writing career
- Genres: Autobiography, belles-lettres, essays, children's literature
- Notable awards: Legion of Honour (1930, 1939); prix Femina (1929); Grand Prix du roman de l'Académie française (1939); U.S. National Book Award (1940)
- Military career
- Allegiance: French Third Republic; Free France
- Branch: French Army; French Air Force; Free French Air Forces
- Service years: 1920–1923; 1939–1940; 1943–1944
- Rank: Commander
- Units: 2nd Chasseurs à Cheval Regiment; 34th Aviation Regiment; 37th Fighter Regiment
- Conflicts: World War II †
- Awards: Croix de Guerre (1940); Croix de Guerre avec palme (1944, posthumous)

Antoine Marie Jean-Baptiste Roger, vicomte de Saint-Exupéry (29 June 1900 – c. 31 July 1944), known simply as Antoine de Saint-Exupéry (UK: /ˌsæ̃tɪɡˈzuːpəri/, US: /-ɡzuːpeɪˈriː/; French: [ɑ̃twan də sɛ̃t‿ɛɡzypeʁi]), was a French writer, poet, journalist and aviator. He is best known as the author of The Little Prince.

Born in Lyon to an aristocratic family, Saint-Exupéry learned to fly during his military service in 1921. In 1926 he joined the airline Latécoère, later Aéropostale, flying mail between Toulouse and Dakar and serving as station manager at Cape Juby in the Sahara. In 1929 he moved to Argentina to run the company's South American subsidiary, Aeroposta Argentina. His experiences as a pilot shaped his early fiction: the short story The Aviator (1926) and the novels Southern Mail (1929) and Night Flight (1931), which won the Prix Femina. During the 1930s he also worked as a reporter, covering the Soviet Union in 1935 and the Spanish Civil War in 1936 and 1937, and survived a crash in the Libyan Desert during an attempted record flight from Paris to Saigon in 1935. His memoir Wind, Sand and Stars (1939) received the Grand Prix du roman de l'Académie française and, in its English edition, the U.S. National Book Award.

Saint-Exupéry joined the French Air Force at the outbreak of World War II and flew reconnaissance missions until France's armistice with Germany in 1940. After being demobilised, he went into exile in the United States, where he lived from 1941 to 1943 and argued publicly for US intervention in the war. During this period he published Flight to Arras (1942) and The Little Prince (1943), a novella he wrote and illustrated himself. Published in France by Gallimard in 1946, The Little Prince became one of the most translated and best-selling books in the world.

In 1943, despite being past the maximum age for a war pilot and in declining health, Saint-Exupéry rejoined his former reconnaissance group in North Africa, flying with the Allied forces. On 31 July 1944 he took off from Corsica, France on a reconnaissance mission over southern France and never returned; his plane is presumed to have crashed. He was officially declared Mort pour la France (lit. 'died for France'). Wreckage of his Lockheed P-38 Lightning was found off the coast of Marseille in 2000 and formally identified in 2003, but the cause of the crash remains unknown.

== Youth and aviation ==
Coat of arms of the de Saint-Exupéry family since the 18th century

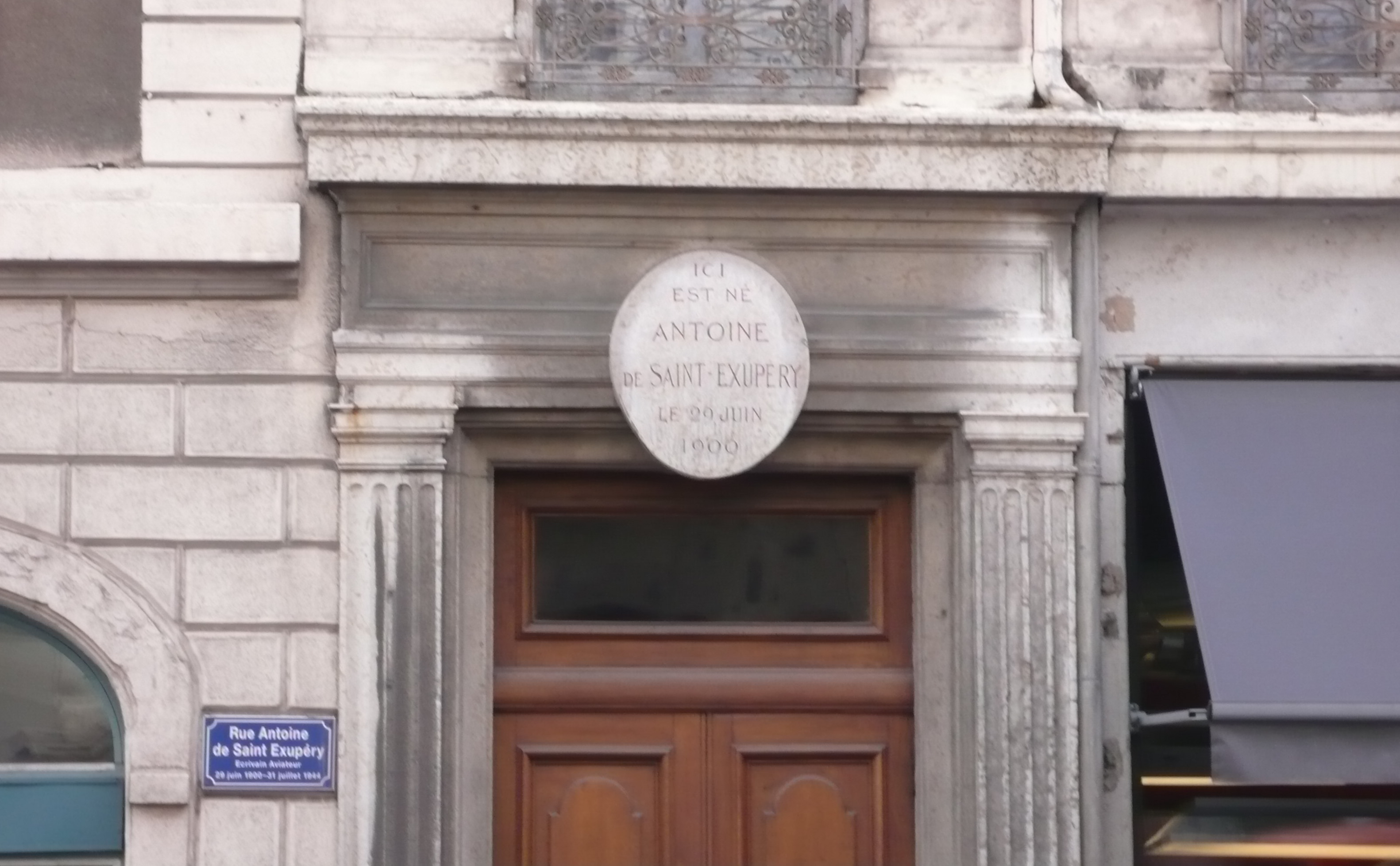
Birthplace of Saint-Exupéry in the Presqu'île section of Lyon, on the street now named after him, in blue at lower left

Saint-Exupéry was born in Lyon, into the French aristocratic Catholic family that traced its lineage back several centuries. Their surname references the 5th-century bishop Saint Exuperius. He was the third child of Viscount Jean de Saint-Exupéry (1863–1904) and his wife, Marie Boyer de Fonscolombe (1875–1972). (Note: Saint-Exupéry was born at No. 8 rue Peyrat, later rue Alphonse Fochier, and still later rue Antoine de Saint-Exupéry, in Lyon's 2nd arrondissement. He was the third of five children (and nicknamed 'Tonio'), his older sisters were Marie-Madeleine ("Biche", 26 January 1897 – 1927), Simone ("Monot", 26 January 1898 – 1978), and his younger siblings François (1902–1917) and Gabrielle ("Didi", 1903–1986). His parents were Viscount Jean de Saint-Exupéry (1863–1904; different sources name his father as Jean-Marc or Caesar de Saint-Exupéry) and Viscountess Marie, née Boyer de Fonscolombe (1875–1972). He was baptized in a Catholic ceremony in his great-aunt's chapel on 15 August 1900 in Saint-Maurice-de-Rémens; his godfather was his uncle, Roger de Saint-Exupéry, Earl of Miremont (1865 – August 1914, killed leading his battalion in Maissin, Belgium, during the First World War), his godmother was his aunt Madeleine Fonscolombe.) His father, an executive of the Le Soleil (The Sun) insurance brokerage, died of a stroke in the train station of La Foux before Saint-Exupéry's 4th birthday. His father's death affected the entire family, transforming their status to that of "impoverished aristocrats".

Saint-Exupéry had three sisters and a younger brother, François, who died at age 15 of rheumatic fever contracted while both were attending the Marianist College Villa St. Jean in Fribourg, Switzerland, during World War I. Saint-Exupéry attended to his brother, who he claimed was his closest confidant, beside his death bed, and later wrote that François "remained motionless for an instant. He did not cry out. He fell as gently as a [young] tree falls", imagery later recrafted into the climactic ending of The Little Prince. At the age of 17, now the only male in the family following the death of his brother, Saint-Exupéry soon assumed the role of a protector and took to consoling his family, despite still being distraught over his brother's death.

After twice failing his final exams at a preparatory Naval Academy, Saint-Exupéry entered the École des Beaux-Arts as an auditor to study architecture for 15 months, again without graduating, and then fell into the habit of accepting odd jobs. In 1921, Saint-Exupéry began his military service as a basic-rank soldier with the 2e Régiment de chasseurs à cheval (2nd Mounted Hunters Regiment) and was sent to Neuhof, near Strasbourg. While there, he took private flying lessons and the following year was offered a transfer from the French Army to the French Air Force. He received his pilot's wings after being posted to the 37th Fighter Regiment in Casablanca, Morocco.

Later, Saint-Exupéry was reposted to the 34th Aviation Regiment at Le Bourget on the outskirts of Paris, and then experienced the first of his many aircraft crashes. Saint-Exupéry, influenced by the urgings of the family of his fiancée, future novelist Louise Lévêque de Vilmorin, subsequently left the air force to take an office job. The couple ultimately broke off their engagement and he worked at several more odd jobs over the next few years.

By 1926, Saint-Exupéry was flying again. He became one of the pioneers of international postal flight, in the days when aircraft had few instruments. Later, he complained that those who flew the more advanced aircraft had become more like accountants than pilots. He worked for Aéropostale between Toulouse and Dakar, and then also became the airline stopover manager for the Cape Juby airfield in the Spanish zone of South Morocco, in the Sahara. His duties included negotiating the safe release of downed fliers taken hostage by Saharan tribes, a perilous task that earned him his first Légion d'honneur from the French Government in 1930.

In 1929, Saint-Exupéry was transferred to Argentina, where he was appointed director of the Aeroposta Argentina airline. He lived in Buenos Aires, in the Galería Güemes building. He surveyed new air routes across South America, negotiated agreements, and occasionally flew the airmail as well as search missions looking for downed fliers. This period of his life is briefly explored in Wings of Courage, an IMAX film by French director Jean-Jacques Annaud.

== Writing career ==
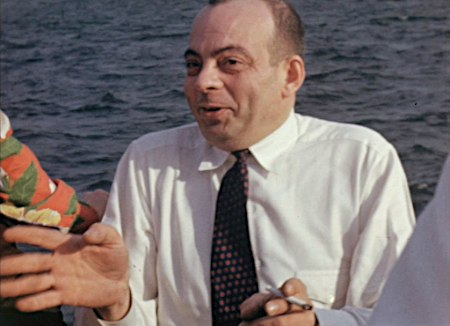
Saint-Exupéry photographed near Montréal, Québec, in May 1942, on a speaking tour in support of France after its armistice with Germany. Saint-Exupéry was highly stressed and bedridden with cholecystitis at this time in his life.

Saint-Exupéry's first novella, L'Aviateur (The Aviator), was published in 1926 in a short-lived literary magazine, Le Navire d'Argent (The Silver Ship). In 1929, his first book, Courrier Sud (Southern Mail) was published. It chronicled his time flying the Casablanca-Dakar mail route.

The 1931 publication of Night Flight established Saint-Exupéry as a rising star in the literary world. It was the first of his major works to gain widespread acclaim, and it won the prix Femina. The novel mirrored his experiences as a mail pilot and director of the Aeroposta Argentina.

That same year, at Grasse, Saint-Exupéry married Consuelo Suncin (née Suncín Sandoval), a once-divorced, once-widowed Salvadoran writer and artist, whom Saint-Exupéry described as having possessed a bohemian spirit and a "viper's tongue".

Saint-Exupéry left and returned to his wife many times—he saw her as both his muse, but, over the long term, the source of much of his angst. The relationship has been described as 'rocky', with Saint-Exupéry travelling frequently and indulging in numerous affairs, most notably with the Frenchwoman Hélène de Vogüé (1908–2003), known as "Nelly" and referred to as "Madame de B." in Saint-Exupéry biographies. (Note: Hélène (Nelly) de Vogüé (1908–2003), born Hélène Jaunez to a French businessman, became a Vogüé, in 1927 and had one child with him, a son named Patrice. Hélène is referred to only as "Madame de B." in multiple Saint-Exupéry biographies. This occurred due to agreements she made with writers before granting them access to her troves of the author-aviator's writings, which she deposited in the French national archives—from which they will not be released until 2053. It is believed she sought her anonymity to protect Saint-Exupéry's reputation, as during the Second World War, the U.S. OSS suspected she was a secret Vichy agent and Nazi collaborator.) Vogüé became Saint-Exupéry's literary executrix after his death and also wrote her own Saint-Exupéry biography under a pseudonym, Pierre Chevrier.

Saint-Exupéry continued to write until the spring of 1943 when he left the United States with American troops bound for North Africa in the Second World War.

== Canadian and American sojourn and The Little Prince ==
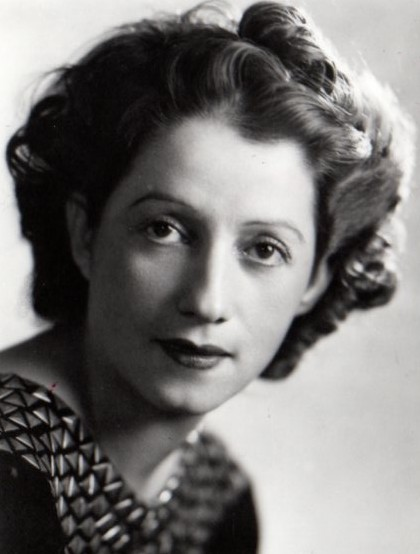
The vain and petulant Rose in The Little Prince was likely inspired by Saint-Exupéry's Salvadoran wife, Consuelo de Saint-Exupéry.

Following the German invasion of France in 1940, Saint-Exupéry flew a Bloch MB.174 with the Groupe de reconnaissance II/33 reconnaissance squadron of the Armée de l'Air.

After France's armistice with Germany, Saint-Exupéry went into exile in North America, escaping through Portugal. He stayed in Estoril, at the Hotel Palácio, between 28 November and 20 December 1940. He described his impressions of his stay in Lettre à un otage. On the same day that he checked out, he boarded the S.S. Siboney and arrived in New York City on the last day of 1940, with the intention of convincing the US to enter the conflict against Nazi Germany quickly. On 14 January 1941, at a Hotel Astor author luncheon attended by approximately 1,500, he belatedly received his National Book Award for Wind, Sand and Stars, won a year earlier while he was occupied witnessing the destruction of the French Army. Consuelo followed him to New York City several months later after a chaotic migration to the southern French town of Oppède, where she lived in an artist's commune, the basis of her autobiography, Kingdom of the Rocks: Memories of Oppède.

Between January 1941 and April 1943, the Saint-Exupérys lived in New York City's Central Park South in twin penthouse apartments, as well as The Bevin House mansion in Asharoken on Long Island, New York and a townhouse on Beekman Place in Manhattan.

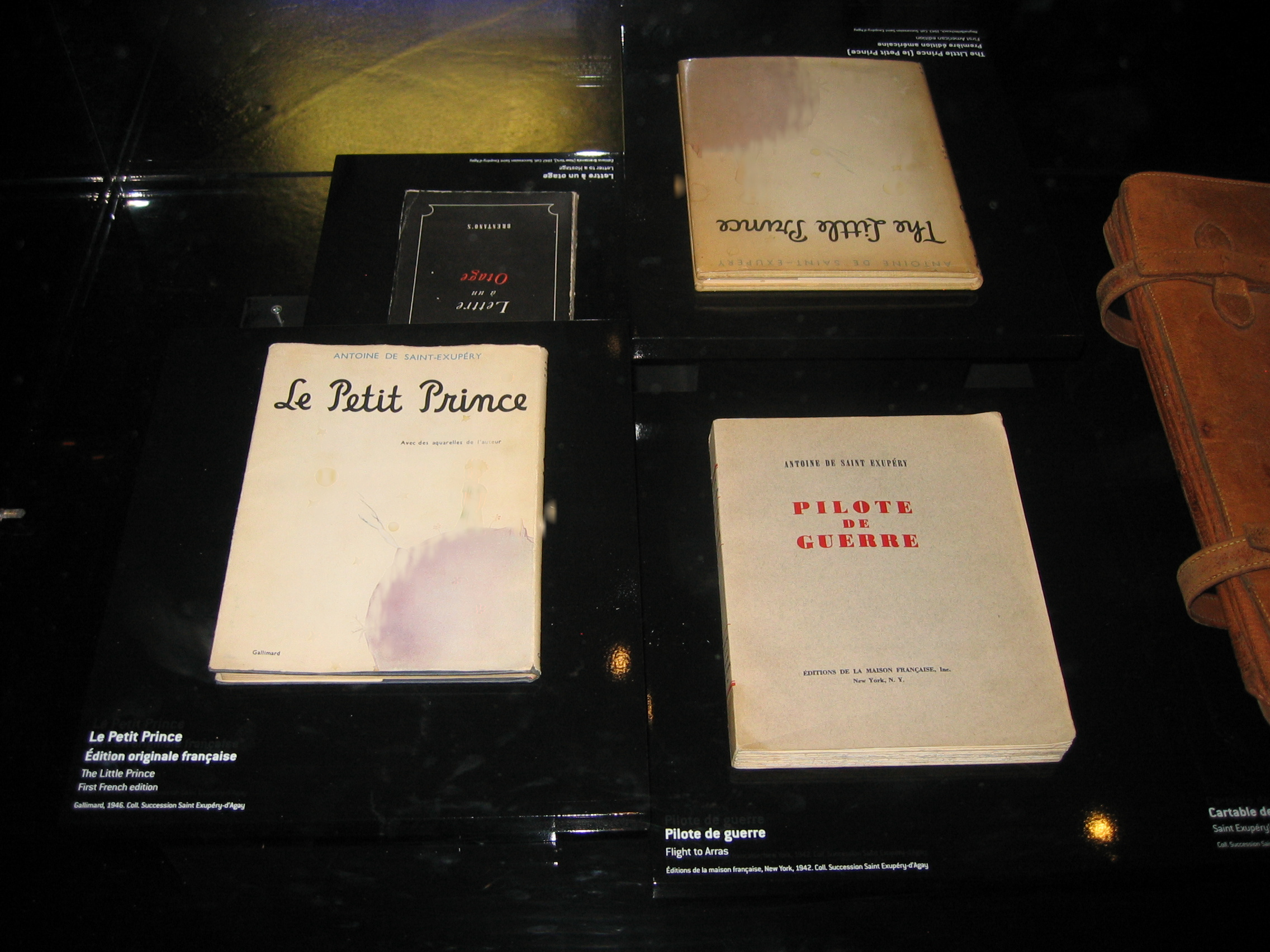
Two editions of The Little Prince (lower left and upper right, artwork not shown) on display at the Saint-Exupéry exhibit at the Air and Space Museum in Paris, France. Also, upper left: Lettre à un otage (Letter to a Hostage), and bottom right: Pilote de guerre (English version: Flight to Arras)

Saint-Exupéry added the hyphen to his surname after his arrival in the United States, saying that he was annoyed with Americans addressing him as "Mr. Exupéry". During this period, he authored Pilote de guerre (Flight to Arras), which earned widespread acclaim, and Lettre à un otage (Letter to a Hostage), dedicated to the 40 million French living under Nazi oppression, in addition to numerous shorter pieces in support of France. The Saint-Exupérys also resided in Quebec City, Canada for several weeks during the late spring of 1942. During their time in Quebec City, the family lived with the philosopher Charles De Koninck and his family, including his "precocious" 8-year-old son, Thomas. (Note: The large home of Charles De Koninck has since been classified as a historical building and has been visited frequently by numerous worldwide personalities from academic, scientific, intellectual, and political circles. Thomas kept a few memories from Saint-Exupéry's visit: "[He was] a great man. He was the aviator. Someone we would get attached to quite easily, who would show interest in us, the kids. He would make us paper planes, drawings. [...] He loved mathematical enigmas." The following year, he published The Little Prince. According to the local legend, Saint-Exupéry received his inspiration from the junior De Koninck, who asked many questions. However, Thomas De Koninck denied this interpretation: "The Little Prince is Saint-Exupéry himself.")

After he returned from his stay in Québec, which had been fraught with illness and stress, the wife of one of his publishers helped persuade Saint-Exupéry to produce a children's book, hoping to calm his nerves and also compete with the new series of Mary Poppins stories by P. L. Travers. Saint-Exupéry wrote and illustrated The Little Prince in New York City and the village of Asharoken in mid-to-late 1942, with the manuscript being completed in October. It was published in early 1943 in both English and French in the United States, and only later appeared in France, posthumously, after the liberation of France, as his works had been banned by the collaborationist Vichy Regime. (Note: Although Saint-Exupéry's regular publisher in France, Gallimard, lists Le Petit Prince as being published in 1946, that apparently is a legalistic interpretation possibly designed to allow for an extra year of the novella's copyright protection period and is based on Gallimard's explanation that sales of the book started only in 1946. Other sources, such as the one referenced, depict the first Librairie Gallimard printing of 12,250 copies as occurring on 30 November 1945.) The Little Prince is dedicated to Saint-Exupéry's close friend Léon Werth.

== Return to war ==
In April 1943, following his 27 months in North America, Saint-Exupéry departed with an American military convoy for Algiers, to fly with the Free French Air Force and fight with the Allies in a Mediterranean-based squadron. Then 43, soon to be promoted to the rank of commandant (major), he was far older than most men in operational units. Although eight years over the age limit for such pilots, he had petitioned endlessly for an exemption which had finally been approved by General Dwight Eisenhower. However, Saint-Exupéry had been suffering pain and immobility due to his many previous crash injuries, to the extent that he could not dress himself in his own flight suit or even turn his head leftwards to check for enemy aircraft.

Saint-Exupéry was assigned with a number of other pilots to his former unit, renamed Groupe de reconnaissance 2/33 "Savoie", flying P-38 Lightnings, which an officer described as "war-weary, non-airworthy craft". The Lightnings were also more sophisticated than models he previously flew, requiring him to undertake seven weeks of stringent training before his first mission. After wrecking a P-38 through engine failure on his second mission, he was grounded for eight months, but was then later reinstated to flight duty on the personal intervention of General Ira Eaker, Deputy Commander of the U.S. Army Air Forces. (Note: After being grounded following his crash, Saint-Exupéry spared no efforts in his campaign to return to active combat flying duty. He utilized all his contacts and powers of persuasion to overcome his age and physical handicap barriers, which would have completely barred an ordinary patriot from serving as a war pilot. Instrumental in his reinstatement was an agreement he proposed to John Phillips, a fluently bilingual Life magazine correspondent in February 1944, where Saint-Exupéry committed to "...write, and I'll donate what I do to you, for your publication, if you get me reinstated into my squadron." Phillips later met with a high-level U.S. Army Air Forces press officer in Italy, Colonel John Reagan McCrary, who conveyed the Life magazine request to General Eaker. The approval for return to flying status would be made "...not through favoritism, but through exception". The brutalized French, it was noted, would cut a German's throat "...probably with more relish than anybody".)

After Saint-Exupéry resumed flying, he also returned to his longtime habit of reading and writing while flying his single-seat Lockheed F-5B (a specially configured P-38 reconnaissance variant). His prodigious studies of literature gripped him and on occasion, he continued his readings of literary works until moments before takeoff, with mechanics having warmed up and tested his aircraft for him in preparation for his flight. On one flight, to the chagrin of his colleagues awaiting his arrival, he circled the airport for an hour after returning, so that he could finish reading a novel. Saint-Exupéry frequently flew with a lined notebook (carnet) during his long solitary flights and some of his philosophical writings were created during such periods when he could reflect on the world below him.

== Disappearance ==
Before his return to flight duty with his squadron in North Africa, the collaborationist Vichy Regime unilaterally promoted Saint-Exupéry as one of its members. Saint-Exupéry was shocked and dismayed by this, in keeping with his historical harsh criticism of the Vichy Regime. Subsequently, French General (later French President) Charles de Gaulle, whom Saint-Exupéry held in low regard, made a public statement that implied that Saint-Exupéry was supporting Germany. Saint-Exupéry became depressed by these events and began to consume alcohol heavily. His physical and mental health began deteriorating. Saint-Exupéry was said, by his peers in the air force, to be intermittently subject to depression, and there was discussion about grounding him. (Note: Saint-Exupéry suffered recurring pain and immobility from previous injuries due to his five serious aircraft crashes. After his death, there were also vague suggestions that his disappearance was the result of suicide rather than aircraft failure or combat loss.)

Saint-Exupéry's last reconnaissance mission was to collect intelligence on German troop movements in and around the Rhone Valley preceding Operation Dragoon, the Allied invasion of southern France. Although he had been reinstated to his old squadron with the provision that he was to fly only five missions, on 31 July 1944, he took off in an unarmed Lockheed Lightning on his ninth reconnaissance mission from an airbase on Corsica. (Note: Various sources state that his final flight was either his seventh, eight, ninth, and even his tenth mission. He volunteered for almost every proposed mission submitted to his squadron, and protested fiercely after being grounded following his second sortie, which ended with a demolished P-38. Saint-Exupéry's friends, colleagues and compatriots were working to keep him grounded and out of harm's way, but his connections in high places, plus a publishing agreement with Life magazine, were instrumental in having the grounding lifted.) To the great alarm of his squadron compatriots, he did not return, vanishing without a trace. (Note: One ruse contemplated by GR II/33's commanders was to expose Saint-Exupéry "accidentally" to the plans of the pending invasion of France so he could be subsequently grounded. No air force general would countermand such a grounding order and risk Saint-Exupéry's being captured by the Germans if he were forced down. Saint-Exupéry's commanding officer—a close friend of his—was ill and absent when the author took off on his final flight. The commander "bawled out" his staff when he learned that a grounding scheme had not been implemented.) Word of his disappearance soon spread across the literary world and then it spread into international headlines.

=== Discovery at sea ===
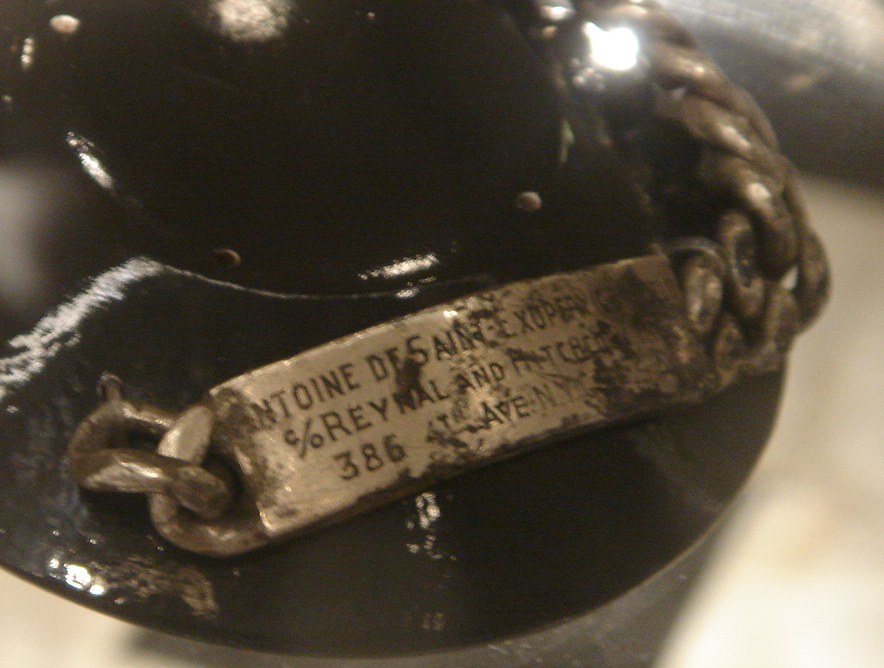
Bracelet of Saint-Exupéry found in 1998

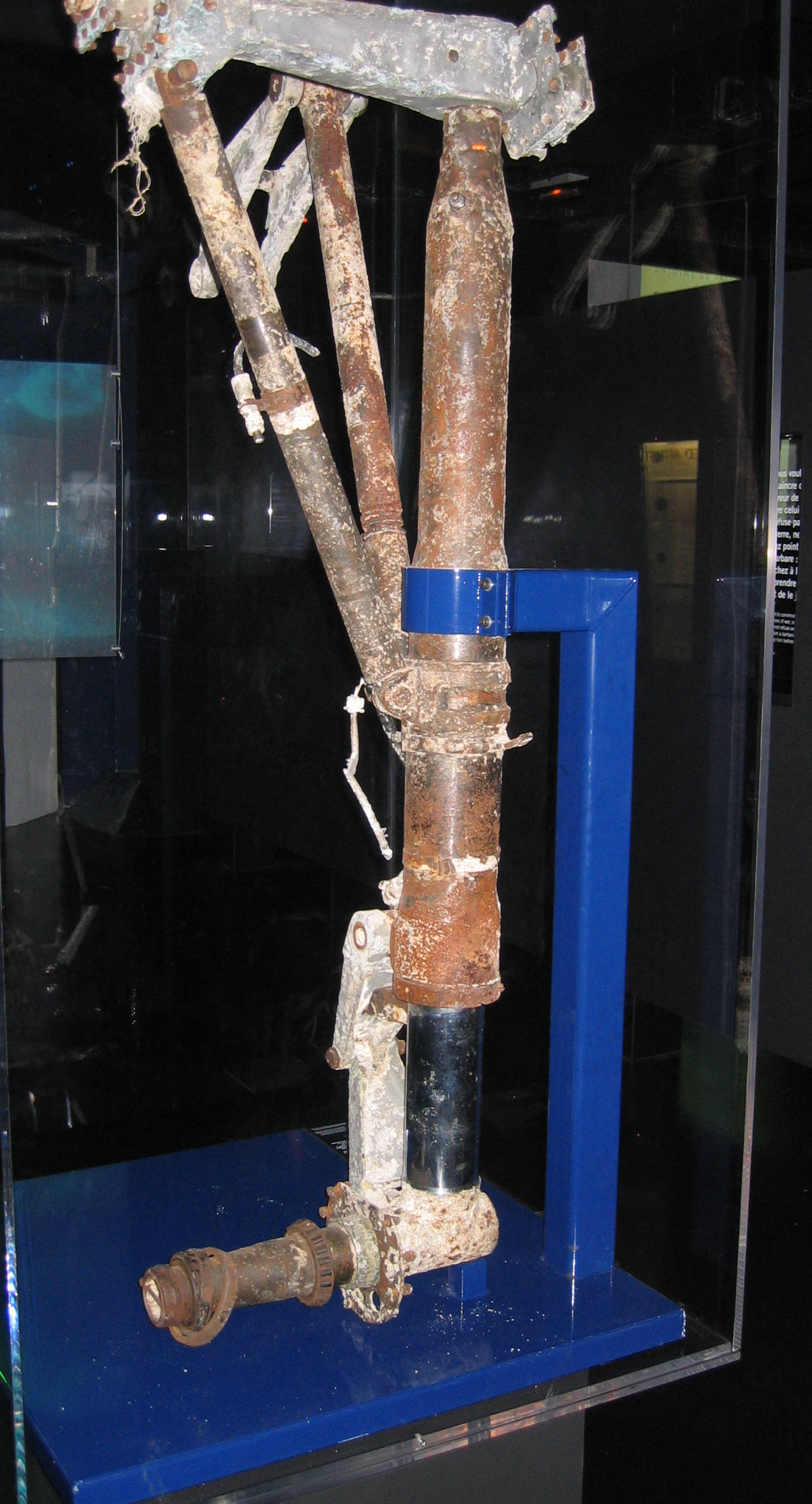
Part of the landing gear of Saint-Exupéry's plane, recovered from the Mediterranean, displayed at the French Air and Space Museum

In September 1998, to the east of Riou Island (south of Marseille), a fisherman found a silver identity bracelet bearing the names of Saint-Exupéry, his wife Consuelo, and his American publisher, Reynal & Hitchcock. The bracelet was hooked to a piece of fabric, presumably from his flight suit. Announcement of the discovery was an emotional event in France, where Saint-Exupéry was a national icon, and some disputed its authenticity because it was found far from his intended flight path, implying that the aircraft might not have been shot down.

In May 2000, a diver found debris from a Lockheed P-38 Lightning submerged off the coast of Marseille, near where the bracelet was found. The discovery galvanized the country, which had conducted searches for his aircraft and speculated on Saint-Exupéry's fate for decades. After a two-year delay imposed by the French government, the remnants of the aircraft were recovered in October 2003. (Note: Saint-Exupéry's P-38, as identified in the wreckage recovery report, was an F-5B-1-LO, LAC 2734 variant, serial number 42-68223, which departed Borgo-Porreta, Bastia, Corsica, France on 31 July 1944, at 8:45 a.m. The report includes an image of a component bearing a serial number which confirmed it came from Saint-Exupéry's aircraft. The size of the debris field—1 km (0.62 mi) long and 400 m (1,300 ft) wide—suggested that the aircraft had struck the water at high velocity.) In 2004, French officials and investigators from the French Underwater Archaeological Department officially confirmed that the wreckage was from Saint-Exupéry's aircraft.

No marks or holes attributable to gunfire were found, but that was not considered significant as only a small portion of the aircraft was recovered. In June 2004, the fragments were given to the Musée de l'Air et de l'Espace (Air and Space Museum) in Le Bourget, Paris, where Saint-Exupéry's life is commemorated in a special exhibit.

=== Speculations in 1948, 1972 and 2008 ===
In 1948, former Luftwaffe telegrapher Rev. Hermann Korth published his war logs, noting an incident that occurred at around noon on 31 July 1944 in which a Focke-Wulf Fw 190 shot down a P-38 Lightning. Korth's account ostensibly supported a shoot-down hypothesis for Saint-Exupéry. The veracity of his log was met with skepticism, because it could have described a P-38 which was flown by Second Lieutenant Gene Meredith on 30 July, shot down south of Nice. (Note: The Luftwaffe pilot was on patrol near Corsica, and could have intercepted Lt. Meredith. Lt. Meredith's remains were not recovered. He is listed on the Tablets of the Missing at the Florence, Italy ABMC Cemetery {ABMC Records}. Lt. Meredith was shot down by Feldwebel Guth of 3./Jagdgruppe 200, the same unit in which Horst Rippert (see below) was serving. Guth's victory claim is recorded in the lists which are held by the German Bundesarchiv-Militärarchiv. The progress of the interception was followed by Allied radar and radio monitoring stations and documented in Missing Air Crew Report 7339 on the loss of Second Lieutenant Gene C. Meredith of the 23rd Photographic Squadron/5th Reconnaissance Group. The intercepted Mediterranean Allied Air Forces Signals Intelligence Report for 30 July records that "an Allied reconnaissance aircraft was claimed shot down at 1115 [GMT]". The last estimated position of Meredith's plane is 4307N, 0756E.)

In 1972, the German magazine Der Landser quoted a letter from Luftwaffe reconnaissance pilot Robert Heichele, in which he purportedly claimed to have shot down a P-38 on 31 July 1944. His account, corroborated by a spotter, seemingly supported a shoot-down hypothesis of Saint-Exupéry. Heichele's account was met with skepticism because he described flying a Focke-Wulf Fw 190 D-9, a variant which had not yet entered Luftwaffe service.

In the lists which are held by the Bundesarchiv-Militärarchiv, no victory was credited to Heichele or his unit in either July or August 1944, and the decrypted report of the day's reconnaissance does not include any flights by 2./NAG 13's Fw 190s. Heichele was shot down on 16 August 1944 and died five days later. (Note: He is buried in the German military cemetery at Dagneux, France.)

In 2008, a French journalist from La Provence, who was investigating Saint-Exupéry's death, contacted former Luftwaffe pilots who flew in the area of Marseille, eventually getting an account from Horst Rippert (1922–2013). Rippert was the older brother of the famous bass singer Ivan Rebroff, who was born in Berlin as Hans-Rolf Rippert. In his memoirs, Horst Rippert, an admirer of Saint-Exupéry's books, expressed both fears and doubts that he was responsible, but in 2003 he stated that he became certain that he was responsible when he learned the location of Saint-Exupéry's wreckage. Rippert claimed to have reported the kill over his radio, but there are no surviving records to verify this account. (Note: The RAF's No. 276 Wing (Signals Intelligence, Allied intercepts of Luftwaffe communications) Operations Record Book for 31 July 1944 notes only: "... three enemy fighter sections between 0758/0929 hours operating in reaction to Allied fighters over Cannes, Toulon and the area to the North. No contacts. Patrol activity north of Toulon reported between 1410/1425 hours".) (Note: In documents OIS 4FG 40 and OP rep 25 (available at SHD / Air), the 4th Fighter Squadron on a sweeping mission from Vercors to Orange, observed two German "bogeys" flying East at 11:30 a.m. Given Saint-Exupéry's fuel reserves and expected mission duration, it is possible that he crossed paths with the German aircraft.)

Rippert's account, as it is discussed in two French and German books, was met with both publicity and skepticism. Luftwaffe comrades expressed doubts in Rippert's claim, given that he held it private for 64 years. (Note: The proposed "suppression" of Rippert's claim due to Saint-Exupéry's stature was also met with skepticism as Luftwaffe pilots tended to immediately report their kills, and the Allies did not broadcast Saint-Exupéry's status as missing for at least two days. It is feasible that Rippert did not push for an official kill, given that he was flying alone with no spotter to corroborate. After the war, Horst Rippert became a television journalist and led the ZDF sports department. He was the brother of German singer Ivan Rebroff. Rippert died in 2013.) Very little German documentation survived the war, and contemporary archival sources, consisting mostly of Allied intercepts of Luftwaffe signals, offer no evidence to verify Rippert's claim. The entry and exit points of Saint-Exupéry's mission were likely near Cannes, yet his wreckage was discovered south of Marseille.

Though it is possible that German fighters could have intercepted, or at least altered, Saint-Exupéry's flight path, the cause of his death remains unknown, and Rippert's account remains one hypothesis among many. (Note: Of further note, as described in the history of the 33rd Photographic Reconnaissance Squadron, a P-38 triggered anti-aircraft fire near Istres on 31 July, a reminder that there are many possible direct or indirect causes of Saint-Exupéry's death.)

== Literary works ==
While not precisely autobiographical, much of Saint-Exupéry's work is inspired by his experiences as a pilot. One notable example is his novella, The Little Prince, a poetic tale self-illustrated in watercolours in which a pilot stranded in the desert meets a young prince fallen to Earth from a tiny asteroid. "His most popular work, The Little Prince was partially based upon a crash he and his navigator survived in the Libyan desert. They were stranded and dehydrated for four days, nearing death when they miraculously stumbled upon a Bedouin who gave them water." Saint-Exupéry wrote in Wind, Sand and Stars that the Bedouin saved their lives and gave them "charity and magnanimity [by] bearing the gift of water." The Little Prince is a philosophical story, including societal criticism, remarking on the strangeness of the adult world. One biographer wrote of his most famous work: "Rarely have an author and a character been so intimately bound together as Antoine de Saint-Exupéry and his Little Prince," and remarking of their dual fates, "...the two remain tangled together, twin innocents who fell from the sky."

Saint-Exupéry's notable literary works (published English translations in parentheses) include:

- L'Aviateur (1926) (The Aviator, in the anthology A Sense of Life)
- Courrier sud (1929) (Southern Mail) – made as a movie in French
- Vol de nuit (1931) (Night Flight) – winner of the full prix Femina and made twice as a movie and a TV film, both in English
- The Wild Garden (1938) – Limited to one thousand copies privately printed for the friends of the author and his publishers as a New Year's Greeting. The story is taken from the forthcoming book, Wind, Sand and Stars, to be published in the spring of 1939.
- Terre des hommes (1939) – winner of the Grand Prix du roman de l'Académie française

Wind, Sand and Stars (simultaneous distinct English version) (Note: The French and English versions of this book (Terre des hommes/Wind, Sand and Stars) differed significantly, with Saint-Exupéry removing sections from the original French version he did not consider appropriate for its targeted U.S. audience, and adding new material specifically written for that group and translated into English, which he could not speak. Although it did not appear in its earliest editions of the English translation, An Appreciation was added to later printings, contributed by Anne Morrow Lindbergh, and earlier published in The Saturday Review of Literature on 14 October 1939.) – winner of the U.S. National Book Award

- Pilote de guerre (1942) (titled in English as: Flight to Arras) – winner of the Grand Prix Littéraire de l'Aéro-Club de France
- Le petit prince (1943) (The Little Prince), posthumous in France – translated into more than 250 languages and dialects and among the top four selling books in the world; made as both movies and TV films in a number of languages, and adapted to numerous other media in many languages
- Lettre à un otage (1944) (Letter to a Hostage, posthumous in English)

=== Published posthumously ===
- Citadelle (1948) (titled in English: as The Wisdom of the Sands) – winner of the Prix des Ambassadeurs
- Lettres à une jeune fille (1950)
- Lettres de jeunesse, 1923–1931 (1953)
- Lettres à l'amie inventée (1953)
- Carnets (1953)
- Lettres à sa mère (1955)
- Un sens à la vie (1956), (A Sense of Life) (Note: The last paragraph of Flying's book review of A Sense of Life incorrectly states that Saint-Exupéry's last mission was a bombing run, when in fact it was a photo-reconnaissance assignment for the pending invasion of Southern France.)
- Lettres de Saint-Exupéry (1960)
- Lettres aux américains (1960)
- Écrits de guerre, 1939–1944 (1982) (Wartime Writings, 1939–1944)
- Manon, danseuse (2007)
- Lettres à l'inconnue (1992)

=== Other works ===
During the 1930s, Saint-Exupéry led a mixed life as an aviator, journalist, author and publicist for Air France, Aéropostale's successor. His journalistic writings for Paris-Soir, Marianne and other newspapers covered events in Indochina and the Far East (1934), the Mediterranean, Soviet Union and Moscow (1935), and the Spanish Civil War (1936–1937). Saint-Exupéry wrote a number of shorter pieces, essays and commentaries for various newspapers and magazines.

Notable among those during World War II was "An Open Letter to Frenchmen Everywhere", which was highly controversial in its attempt to rally support for France against Nazi oppression at a time when the French were sharply divided between support of the Gaullists and Vichy factions. It was published in The New York Times Magazine in November 1942, in its original French in Le Canada, de Montréal at the same time, and in Pour la Victoire the following month. Other shorter pieces include (in French except where translated by others to English):

- "Une Lettre de M. de Saint-Exupéry", Les Annales politiques et littéraires, 15 December 1931; (extracts from a letter written to Benjamin Crémieux).
- Preface of Destin de Le Brix by José le Boucher, Nouvelle Librairie Française, 1932.
- Preface of Grandeur et servitude de l'aviation by Maurice Bourdet, Paris: Editions Corrêa, 1933.
- "Reflections on War", translated from Paris-Soir and published in Living Age, November 1938, pp. 225–228.
- Preface of Vent se lève (French translation of Listen! The Wind) by Anne Morrow Lindbergh, Paris: Editions Corrêa, 1939. (Note: In exchange, Lindbergh contributed "An Appreciation" to the later printings of Saint-Exupéry's Wind, Sand and Stars, earlier published in The Saturday Review of Literature on 14 October 1939.)
- Preface of Pilotes d'essai by Jean-Marie Conty, Paris: Edition Spes, 1939.
- "Books I Remember", Harper's Bazaar, April 1941.
- "Letter to Young Americans", The American High School Weekly, 25 May 1942, pp. 17–18.
- "Voulez-vous, Français, vous reconcilier?", Le Canada, de Montreal, 30 November 1942.
- "L'Homme et les éléments", Confluences, 1947, Vol. VII, pp. 12–14 (issue dedicated to Saint-Exupéry; originally published in English in 1939 as 'The Elements' in Wind, Sand and Stars).
- "Lettre Inédite au General C", Le Figaro Littéraire, 10 April 1948 (posthumous).
- "Seigneur Berbère", Éditions de la Table ronde, No. 7, July 1948 (posthumous).

=== Censorship and publication bans ===
Pilote de guerre (Flight To Arras), which describes the German invasion of France, was slightly censored when it was released in its original French during wartime by Éditions Gallimard in his homeland in 1942, due to the removal of a derogatory remark which was made about Hitler (which Gallimard failed to reinsert in subsequent editions after World War II). Shortly after the book's wartime release in France, Nazi appeasers and Vichy supporters objected to its praise of one of Saint-Exupéry's squadron colleagues, Captain Jean Israël, who was portrayed as being amongst the squadron's bravest defenders during the Battle of France.

In support of their German occupiers and masters, Vichy authorities attacked the author as a defender of Jews (in racist terms) leading to the praised book being banned in France, along with prohibitions against further printings of Saint-Exupéry's other works. Prior to France's liberation new printings of Saint-Exupéry's works were made available there only by means of covert print runs, such as that of February 1943 when 1,000 copies of an underground version of Pilote de guerre were printed in Lyon.

A further complication occurred due to Saint-Exupéry's view of General Charles de Gaulle, whom he held in low regard. Early in the war, de Gaulle became the leader of the Free French Forces in exile, with his headquarters in London. Even though both men were working to free France from Nazi occupation, Saint-Exupéry viewed de Gaulle with apprehension as a possible post-war dictator, and he consequently provided no public support to the General. De Gaulle retaliated by implying that the author was a supporter of Germany, and he then had his literary works banned in France's North African colonies. Saint-Exupéry's writings were, with irony, banned simultaneously in occupied France and the territory which was controlled by Free France.

=== Extension of copyrights in France ===
Due to Saint-Exupéry's wartime death, the French government awarded his estate the civil code designation Mort pour la France (English: Died for France) in 1948. Amongst the law's provisions is an increase of 30 years to the duration of the original copyright's duration of 70 years; thus most of Saint-Exupéry's creative works will not fall out of copyright status in France for an extra 30 years.

== Honours and legacy ==
Images of remembrance

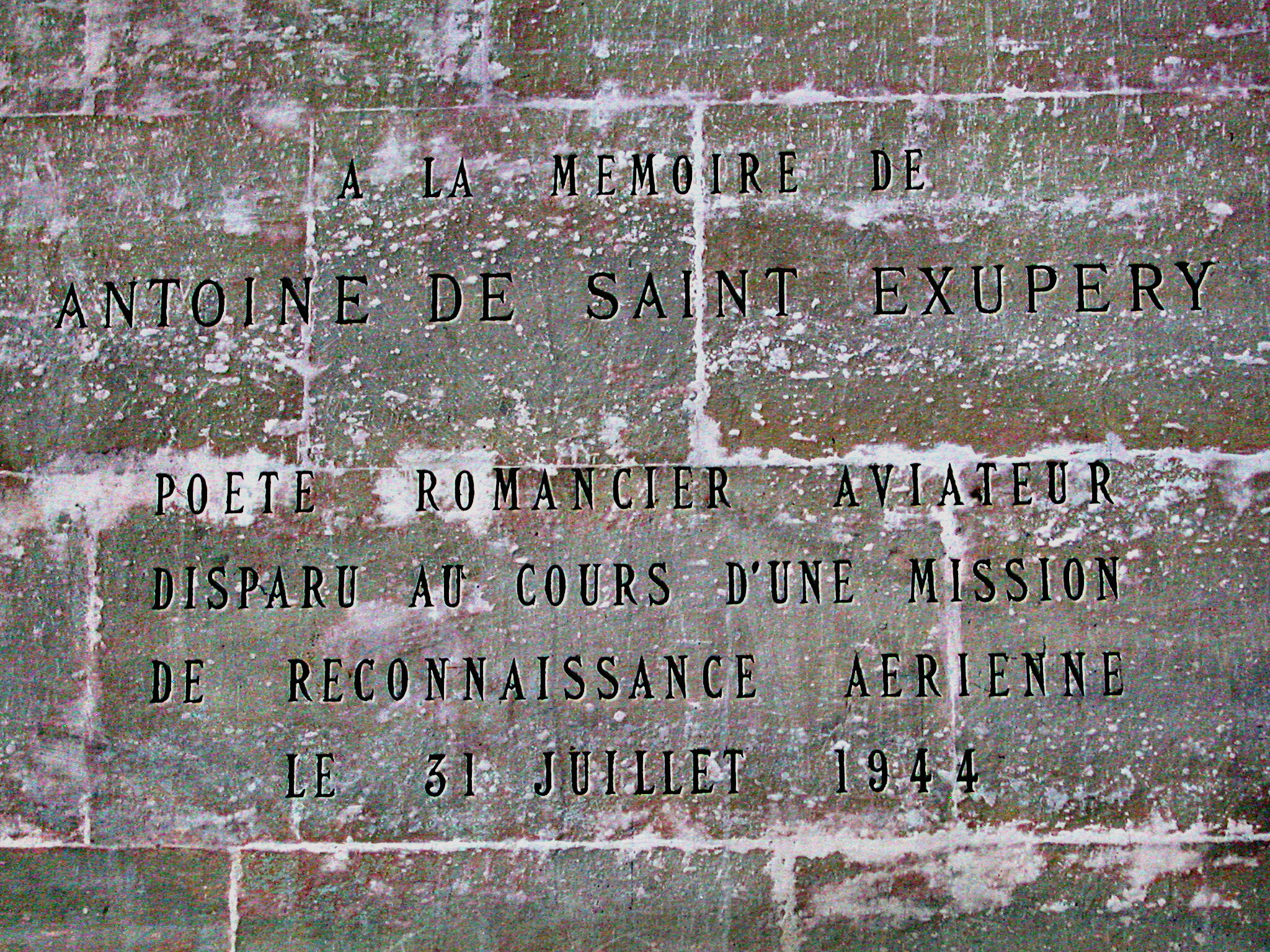
Commemorative inscription in the Panthéon of Paris

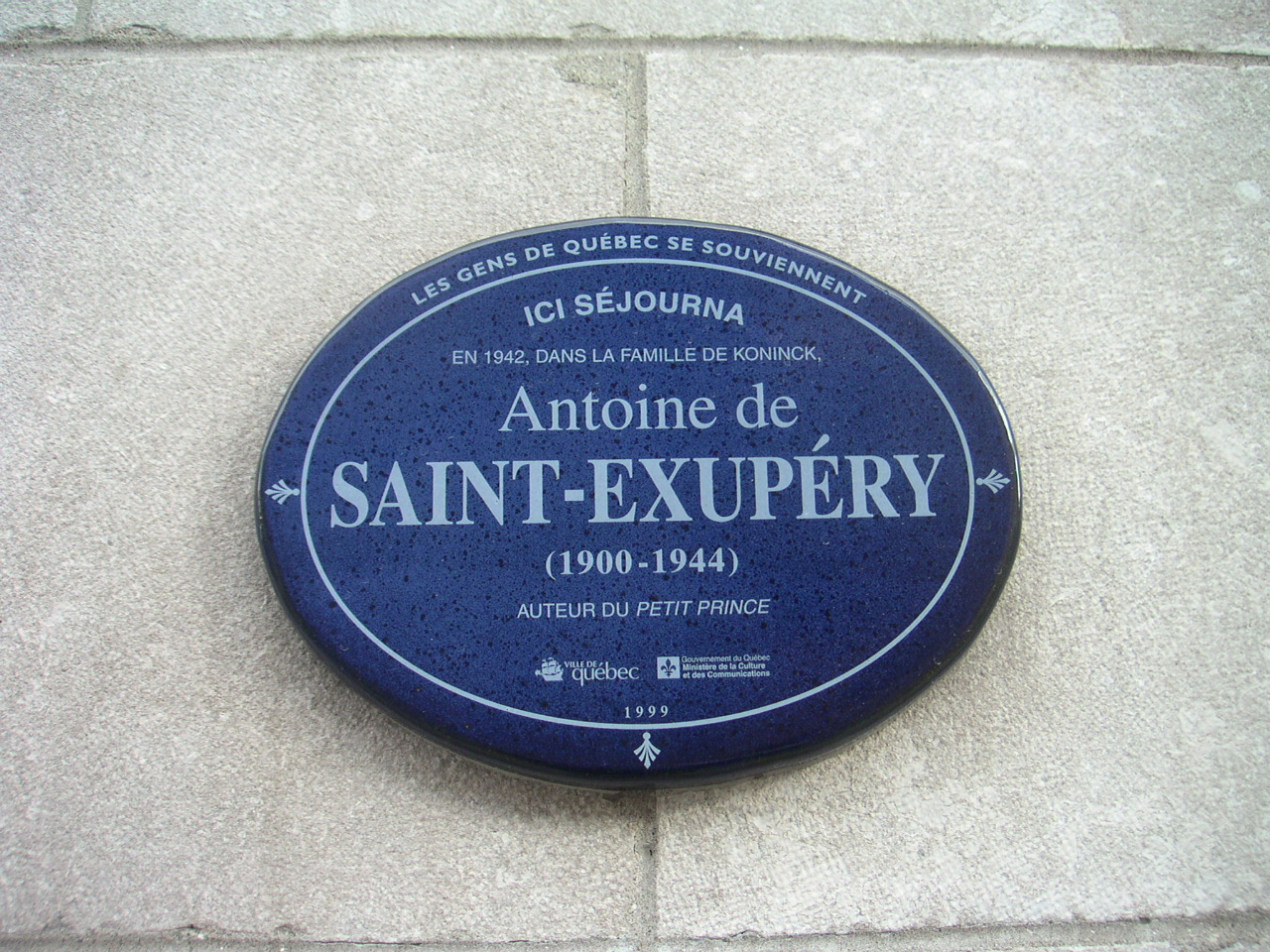
Historical marker where the Saint-Exupérys resided in Quebec
- Saint-Exupéry is commemorated with an inscription in the Panthéon in Paris, France's repository of historical greats. Although his body was never identified, his name was added to the Panthéon in November 1967 by a French legislative act. The inscription reads: "A LA MEMOIRE DE • ANTOINE DE SAINT EXUPERY • POETE ROMANCIER AVIATEUR • DISPARU AU COURS D'UNE MISSION • DE RECONNAISSANCE AERIENNE • LE 31 JUILLET 1944" (To the memory of Antoine de Saint-Exupéry, poet, novelist, aviator, missing during an aerial reconnaissance mission, 31 July 1944). Amongst other honours from France, he was named a Chevalier de la Légion d'honneur in April 1930 and was promoted to Officier de la Légion d'honneur in January 1939. He was awarded the Croix de Guerre in 1940 and was posthumously awarded the Croix de Guerre avec Palme in 1944.
- From 1993 until the introduction of the euro, Saint-Exupéry's portrait and several of his drawings from The Little Prince appeared on France's 50-franc banknote. The French Government also later minted a 100-franc commemorative coin, with Saint-Exupéry on its obverse side, and the Little Prince on its reverse. Brass-plated souvenir Monnaie de Paris commemorative medallions were also created in his honour, depicting the pilot's portrait over the P-38 Lightning aircraft he last flew.
- In 1999, the Government of Quebec and Quebec City added a historical marker to the family home of Charles De Koninck, head of the Department of Philosophy at Université Laval, where the Saint-Exupérys stayed while lecturing in Canada for several weeks during May and June 1942.
- In 2000, on the centenary of his birth, in the city where he was born, he was memorialised when the Lyon Satolas Airport was renamed the Lyon-Saint Exupéry Airport. Lyon's TGV bullet train station was also renamed Gare de Lyon Saint-Exupéry. The author is additionally commemorated by a statue in Lyon, depicting a seated Saint-Exupéry with the little prince standing behind him.
- A street in Montesson, a suburb of Paris, is named after him as Rue Antoine de Saint-Exupéry.

=== Museums and exhibits ===
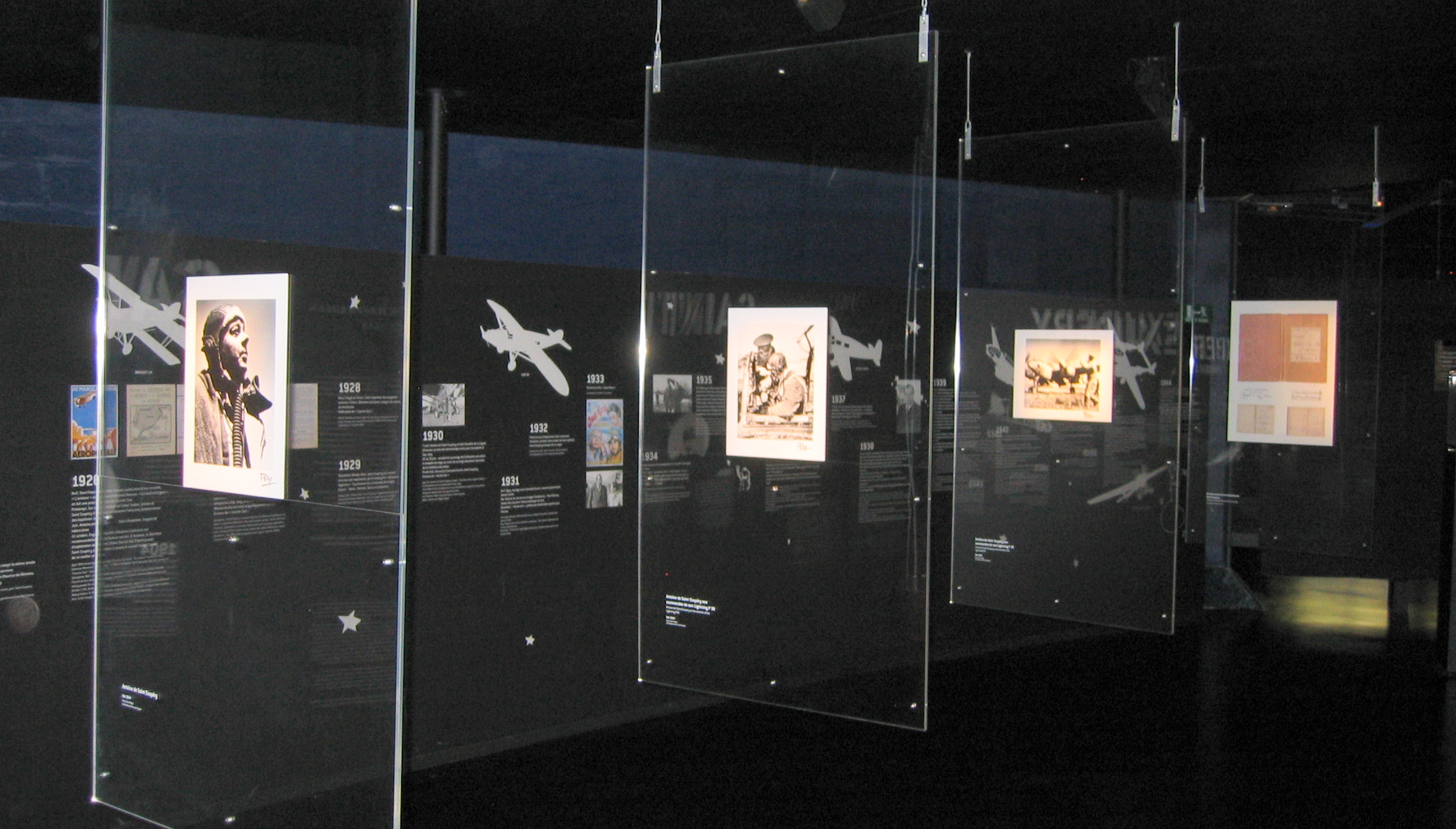
A portion of the Saint-Exupéry exhibit, in the French Air & Space Museum, Le Bourget, Paris.

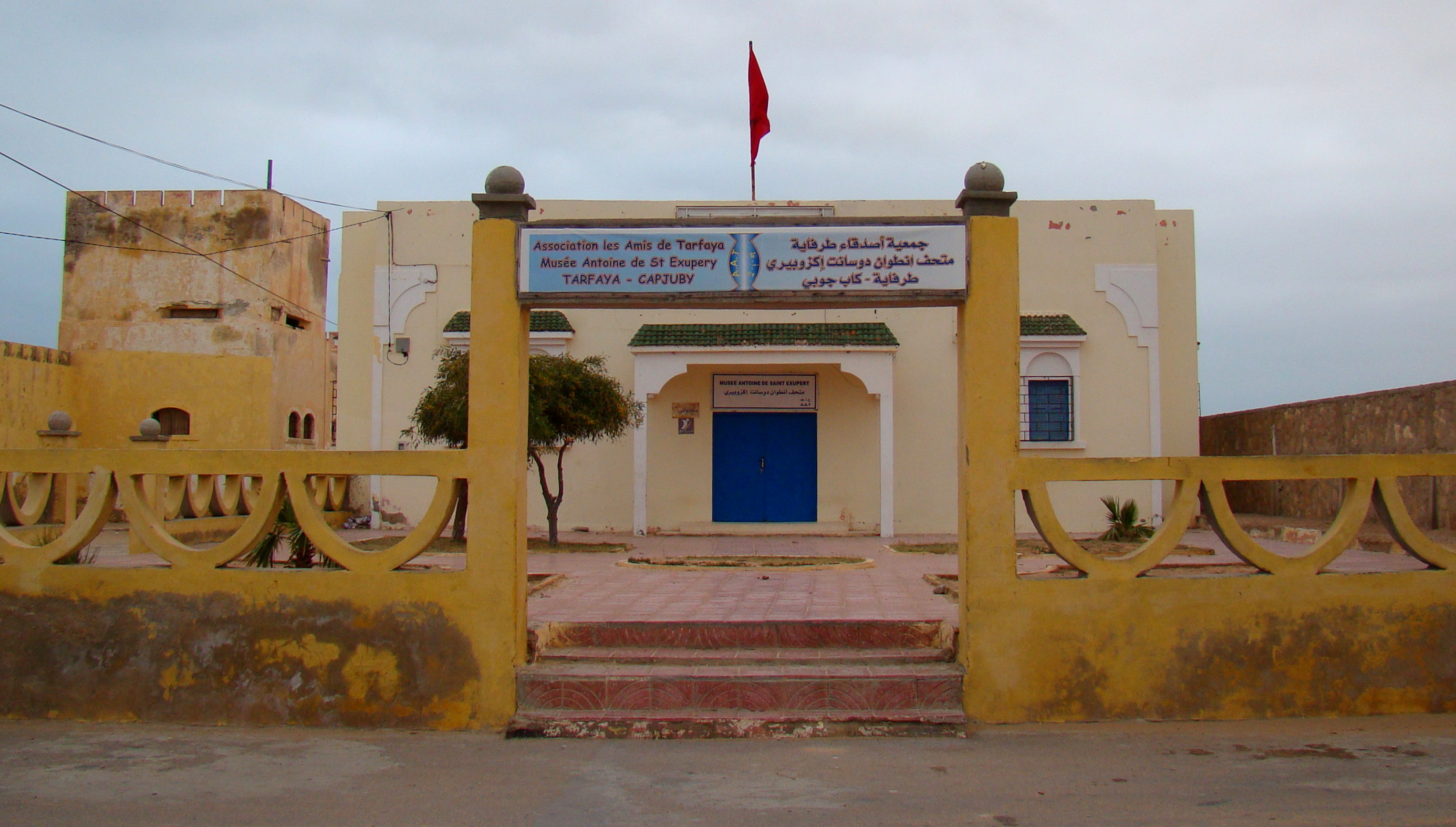
The facade of the Antoine de Saint-Exupery Museum in Tarfaya, Morocco.

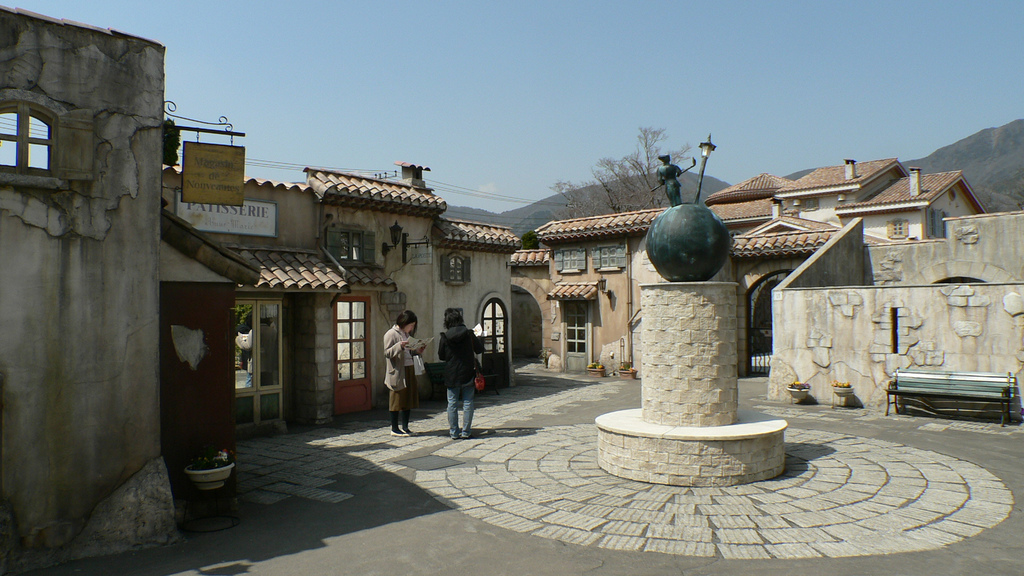
Lamplighter Square at The Museum of The Little Prince, Hakone, Japan

Museum exhibits, exhibitions and theme villages dedicated to both him and his diminutive Little Prince have been created in Le Bourget, Paris and other locations in France, as well as in the Republic of South Korea, Japan, Morocco, Brazil, the United States and Canada:

- The Air and Space Museum at Paris's Le Bourget Airport, in cooperation with The Estate of Saint-Exupéry-d'Agay, has created a permanent exhibit of 300 m^{2} dedicated to the author, pilot, person and humanist. The Espace Saint-Exupéry exhibit, officially inaugurated in 2006 on the anniversary of the aviator's birthday, traces each stage of his life as an airmail pioneer, eclectic intellectual artist, and military pilot. It includes artefacts from his life: photographs, his drawings, letters, some of his original notebooks (carnets) he scribbled in voluminously and which were later published posthumously, plus remnants of the unarmed P-38 he flew on his last reconnaissance mission and which were recovered from the Mediterranean Sea.
- In Tarfaya, Morocco, next to the Cape Juby airfield where Saint-Exupéry was based as an Aéropostale airmail pilot/station manager, Antoine de Saint-Exupery Museum was created honouring both him and the company. A small monument at the airfield is also dedicated to them.
- In Gyeonggi-do, South Korea, and Hakone, Japan, theme village museums have been created honouring Saint-Exupéry's Little Prince.
- In January 1995, the Alberta Aviation Museum of Edmonton, Alberta, Canada, in conjunction with the cultural organization Alliance française, presented a showing of Saint-Exupéry letters, watercolours, sketches and photographs.
- In São Paulo, Brazil, through 2009, the Oca Art Exhibition Centre presented Saint-Exupéry and The Little Prince as part of The Year of France and The Little Prince. The displays covered over 10,000 m^{2} on four floors, and chronicled Saint-Exupéry, The Little Prince and their philosophies, as visitors passed through theme areas of the desert, asteroids, stars, and the cosmos. The ground floor of the giant exhibition was laid out as a huge map of the routes flown by the author with Aeropostale in South America and around the world. Also included was a full-scale replica of the author's crashed Caudron Simoun, lying wrecked on the ground of a simulated Libyan desert following his disastrous Paris-Saigon race attempt. The miraculous survival of Saint-Exupéry and his mechanic/navigator was subsequently chronicled in the award-winning memoir Wind, Sand and Stars (Terre des hommes), and also formed the introduction of his most famous work The Little Prince (Le Petit Prince).
- In 2011, the City of Toulouse, France, home of Airbus and the pioneering airmail carrier Aéropostale, in conjunction with the Estate of Saint-Exupéry-d'Agay and the Youth Foundation of Antoine de Saint-Exupéry, hosted a major exposition on Saint-Exupéry and his experience with Aéropostale. The exposition, titled L'année Antoine de Saint-Exupéry à Toulouse, exhibited selected personal artefacts of the author-aviator, including gloves, photos, posters, maps, manuscripts, drawings, models of the aircraft he flew, some of the wreckage from his Sahara Desert plane crash, and the personal silver identification bracelet engraved with his and Consuelo's name, presented by his U.S. publisher, which was recovered from his last, ultimate crash site in the Mediterranean Sea.
- A number of other prominent exhibitions were created in France and the United States, many of them in 2000, honouring the centenary of the author-aviator's birth.
- In January 2014, New York City's Morgan Library & Museum featured a major three-month-long exhibition, The Little Prince: A New York Story. Celebrating the 70th anniversary year of the novella's publication, its exhibits included many of Saint-Exupéry's original manuscript pages, his story's preliminary drawings and watercolor paintings, and also examined Saint-Exupéry's creative writing processes.

=== International ===
- Saint-Exupéry's 1939 memoir Terre des hommes (titled as Wind, Sand and Stars in English) was chosen to create the central theme (Terre des Hommes–Man and His World) of the 1967 International and Universal Exposition in Montreal, Quebec, Canada (Expo '67), the most successful world's fair of the 20th century. The central theme, which also generated the 17 subsidiary elements used for the world's fair, was elucidated at a 1963 Montebello, Quebec, conference held with some of Canada's leading thinkers. At Montebello, French-Canadian author Gabrielle Roy helped choose the central theme by quoting Saint-Exupéry on mankind's place in the universe:

"Être homme, c'est précisément être responsible. C'est sentir, en posant sa pierre, que l'on contribue à bâtir le monde" (to be a man is to be responsible, to feel that by laying one's own stone, one contributes to building the world)

Additionally, Michèle Lalonde and André Prévost's oratorio Terre des hommes, performed at the Place des Nations opening ceremonies and attended by the international delegates of the participating countries, strongly projected the French writer's 'idealist rhetoric'. Consuelo de Saint-Exupéry (1901–1979), his widow, was also a guest of honour at the opening ceremonies of the World's Fair.

- Asteroid 2578 Saint-Exupéry, discovered in November 1975 by Russian astronomer Tamara Smirnova and provisionally cataloged as Asteroid 1975 VW3, was renamed in the author-aviator's honour. Another asteroid was named as 46610 Bésixdouze (translated to and from both hexadecimal and French as 'B612'). Additionally the terrestrial-asteroid protection organization B612 Foundation was named in tribute to the author's Little Prince, who fell to Earth from Asteroid B-612.
- Philatelic tributes have been printed in at least 25 other countries as of 2011. Only three years after his death, the pilot-aviator was first featured on an 8 franc French West Africa airmail stamp (Scott Catalog # C11). France followed several months later in 1948 with an 80 franc airmail stamp honouring him (CB1), and later with another stamp honouring both him and airmail pioneer Jean Mermoz, plus the supersonic Concorde passenger airliner, in 1970 (C43). In commemoration of the 50th anniversary of the writer's death, Israel issued a stamp honouring "Saint-Ex" and The Little Prince in 1994.
- In Argentina and Brazil, where Saint-Exupéry became the founding director of the pioneering South American airmail airline Aeroposta Argentina:
  - the Aguja Saint Exupery is a mountain peak located near the Cerro Chaltén (also known as Monte Fitz Roy) in the Los Glaciares National Park in Patagonia, Argentina, The mountain peak is named in Saint-Exupéry's honour;
  - the San Antonio Oeste municipal airport was named Aerodromo Saint Exupery. A small museum exhibit resides in the airport building;
  - the small Brazilian airport serving Ocauçu, São Paulo is named after the pilot.
  - several Argentinian schools are also named after the author-aviator.
  - The main street of the Campeche neighborhood in Florianópolis, Brazil, is named Avenida Pequeno Príncipe because of his connection to the region.

=== Institutions and schools ===
- In 1960 the humanitarian organization Terre des hommes, named after Saint-Exupéry's 1939 philosophical memoir Terre des hommes (titled as Wind, Sand and Stars in English), was founded in Lausanne, Switzerland by Edmond Kaiser. Other Terre des Hommes societies were later organized in more countries with similar social aid and humanitarian goals. The several independent groups joined to form a new umbrella organization, Terre des Hommes-Fédération Internationale (TDHFI, in English: International Federation of Terre des Hommes, or IFTDH). The national constituents first met in 1966 to formalize their new parent organization, headquartered in Geneva, Switzerland. As of 2009 eleven organizations in Canada, Denmark, Germany, France, Italy, Luxembourg, the Netherlands, Spain, Switzerland, and Syria belonged to the Federation. An important part of their works is their consulting role to the United Nations Economic and Social Council (ECOSOC).
- In June 2009, the Antoine de Saint-Exupéry Youth Foundation (FASEJ) was founded in Paris by the Saint-Exupéry–d'Agay Estate, to promote education, art, culture, health and sports for youth worldwide, especially those from disadvantaged backgrounds. This organization, which follows Saint-Exupéry's philosophies and his memory, was financed in part by the sale of one of his original 1936 handwritten manuscripts at a Sotheby's auction for €312,750.
- Numerous public schools, lycées, high schools, colleges and technical schools have been named in honour of Saint-Exupéry across France, Europe, Québec and South America, as well as at least two in Africa. The École Antoine de Saint-Exupéry de Kigali, a French international school in Rwanda, is named after him, as is École Francaise Antoine de Saint-Exupéry in Saint Louis, Senegal.

=== Other ===
Numerous other tributes have been awarded to honour Saint-Exupéry and his most famous literary creation, his Little Prince:

- The GR I/33 (later renamed as the 1/33 Belfort Squadron), one of the French Air Force squadrons Saint-Exupéry flew with, adopted the image of the Little Prince as part of the squadron and tail insignia on its Dassault Mirage fighter jets.
- Google celebrated Saint-Exupéry's 110th birthday with a special logotype depicting the little prince being hoisted through the heavens by a flock of birds.
- Numerous streets and place names are named after the author-aviator throughout France and other countries.
- Cafe Saint-Ex, a popular bar and nightclub in Washington, D.C. near the U-Street corridor, holds Saint-Exupéry as its name source.
- Uruguayan airline BQB Líneas Aéreas named one of its aircraft, an ATR-72 (CX-JPL), in honour of the aviator.
- International Watch Company (IWC) has created many Saint-Exupéry tribute versions of several of their wristwatch lines, with the distinctive 'A' from his signature featured on the dial.
- The American aviation magazine Flying ranked Saint-Exupéry number 41 on their list of the "51 Heroes of Aviation".
- The French 50-franc banknote depicted Antoine de Saint-Exupéry and had several features that allude to his works.
- The new flagship of CMA CGM Group for celebrating her 40th anniversary, takes the name of Antoine de Saint-Exupéry to commemorate his achievement.

== In popular culture ==
=== Film ===
- Wings of Courage is a 1995 docudrama by French director Jean-Jacques Annaud. The movie was the world's first dramatic picture shot in the IMAX format and is an account of the true story of early airmail pilots Henri Guillaumet (played by Craig Sheffer), Saint-Exupéry played by Tom Hulce, and several others.
- Saint-Exupéry and his wife Consuelo were portrayed by Bruno Ganz and Miranda Richardson in the 1996 biopic Saint-Ex, a British film biography of the French author-pilot. It also featured Eleanor Bron and was filmed and distributed in the United Kingdom, with scripting by Frank Cottrell Boyce. The film combines elements of biography, documentary, and dramatic licence.
- The 2024 French film Saint-Exupéry (originally titled Saint-Ex) written and directed by Pablo Agüero depicts Saint-Exupéry's (Louis Garrel) airmail career in the Andes, revolving around his efforts to save his friend, Henri Guillaumet (Vincent Cassel).

=== TV Series ===
- In the 2009 Japanese dorama Karei naru Spy (華麗なるスパイ), produced by Nippon Television, a spy named "Antoine de Saint-Exumopéry" (アントワーヌ ド・サン・テグモペリ ) is played by actor MOUNIR. (Episode 2). The spy works for the evil Mr.Takumi (ミスター匠), leader of an international terrorist organization.

=== Literature ===
- After his disappearance, Consuelo de Saint-Exupéry wrote The Tale of the Rose, which was published in 2000 and subsequently translated into 16 languages.
- Saint-Exupéry is mentioned in Tom Wolfe's The Right Stuff: "A saint in short, true to his name, flying up here at the right hand of God. The good Saint-Ex! And he was not the only one. He was merely the one who put it into words most beautifully and anointed himself before the altar of the right stuff."
- Comic-book author Hugo Pratt imagined the fantastic story of Saint-Exupéry's last flight in Saint-Exupéry: le dernier vol (1994).
- Saint-Exupéry is the subject of the 2013 historical novel Studio Saint-Ex (Knopf, New York / Penguin, Canada) by Ania Szado. In the novel Saint-Exupéry awaits the Americans' entry into World War II, while writing The Little Prince in New York.
- Wind, Sand and Stars is an important book to narrator Theo Decker, who re-reads it often, in The Goldfinch (2013) by Donna Tartt.
- Saint-Exupéry was the principal character in Antonio Iturbe's 2017 Spanish-language novel A cielo abierto which was translated into English and published in 2021 with the title The Prince of the Skies.

=== Music ===
- Saint-Exupéry's death and speculation that Horst Rippert shot him down are the subject of "Saint Ex", a song on Widespread Panic's eleventh studio album, Dirty Side Down.
- "P 38", a 1983 song by the Swedish pop band Webstrarna took inspiration from Saint-Ex's disappearance in July 1944.
- The Norwegian progressive rock band Gazpacho's concept album Tick Tock is based on Saint-Exupéry's desert crash.
- "On the Planet of the Living", a song sung by Eduard Khil, was dedicated to Saint-Exupéry.
- "St. Exupéry Blues" – a song by Russian folk-rock band Melnitsa from their album "Alchemy"
- In "Far Side of the World", a song by American singer-songwriter Jimmy Buffett, he mentions both Saint-Exupery and "Wind, Sand and Stars".

=== Theatre ===
- In August 2011, Saint-Ex, a theatrical production of Saint-Exupéry's life, premiered in Weston, Vermont.
- Saint-Exupéry appears as one of the three historical characters in the one-act play, DINNER @ AMELIA'S ((c) 2019) by Myles A. Garcia, an American playwright. The two other historical characters in the same play are Alberto Santos-Dumont, the Brazilian pioneering aviator, and T. E. Lawrence (the future Lawrence of Arabia).

== See also ==
- List of people who disappeared mysteriously at sea

=== General ===
- Consuelo de Saint-Exupéry, wife of Saint-Exupéry
- Indexed listing of Wikipedia's Saint-Exupéry articles

=== Literary works in English ===
- The Aviator
- Southern mail
- Night Flight
- Wind, Sand and Stars
- Flight to Arras
- The Little Prince
- A Sense of Life

=== Media and popular culture ===
- List of The Little Prince adaptations
- Saint-Ex, a 1996 British biopic

== Honours and awards ==
- Officier of the Order of Legion of Honour
- Croix de Guerre 1939-1945
