= Courrier sud (novel) =

Novel by Antoine de Saint-Exupéry

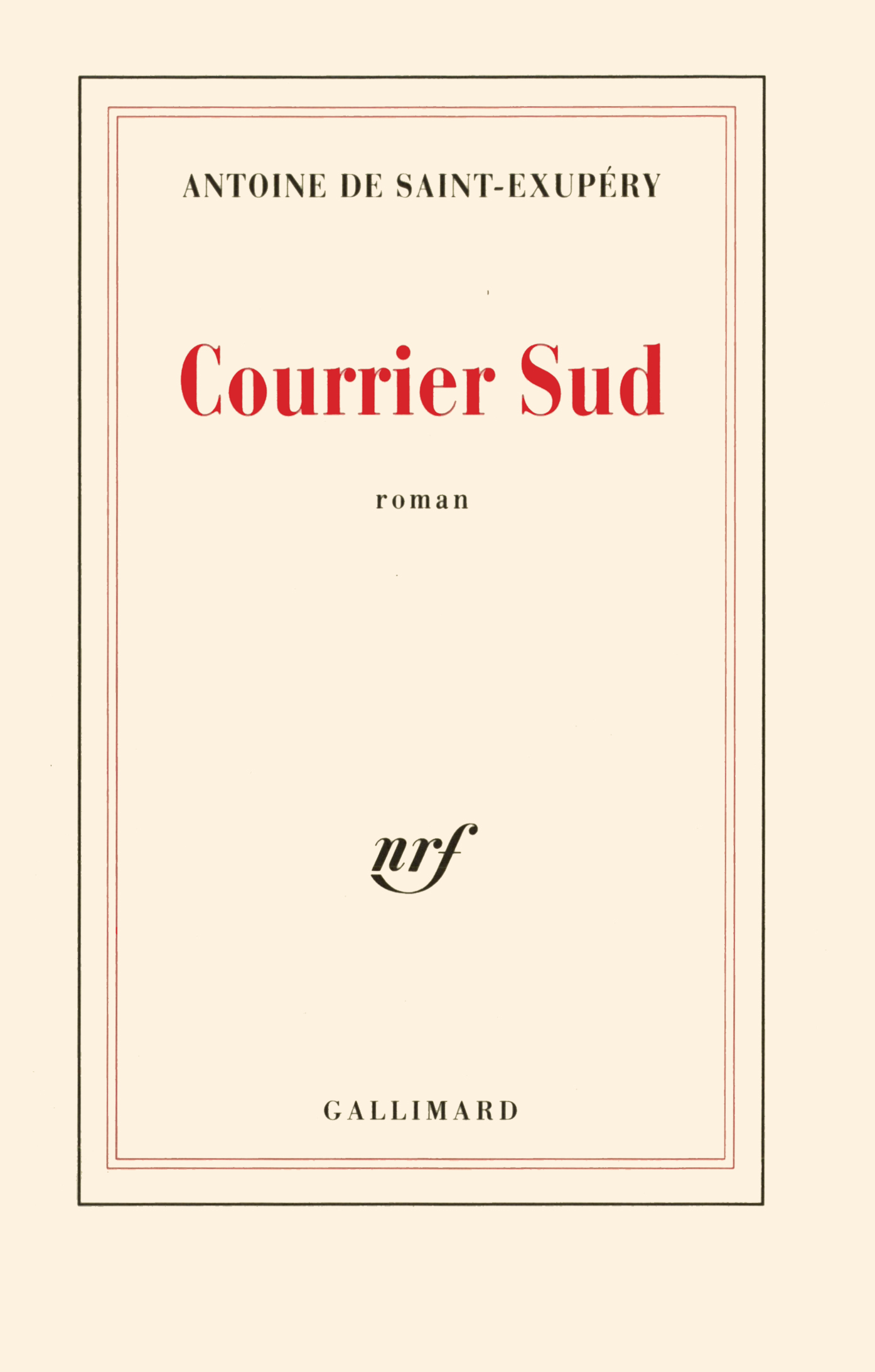
- Courrier sud cover
- Author: Antoine de Saint-Exupéry
- Original title: Courrier sud
- Language: French
- Genre: Novel
- Publisher: Éditions Gallimard
- Publication date: 1929
- English publication date: 1933
- Pages: 232
- ISBN: 207025657X

Courrier sud, translated as Southern Mail and Southern Carrier, is the first novel by Antoine de Saint-Exupéry, published in 1929. Encouraged by the publication of his short story The Aviator, Saint-Exupéry followed up with this work based on his pioneering flights for the French airmail service.

A structured novel, it has three sections, the shorter outer sections being set in the heat and daylight of the Sahara Desert, the long central section in France at night and in pelting rain. The story thread consists of an investigation into the disappearance of an aviator in the Sahara.

The novel was published in an English translation by Stuart Gilbert in 1933. It was adapted into the 1937 French film Courrier sud directed by Pierre Billon.
