= Toulouse Aerospace =

Campus project in Occitanie, France

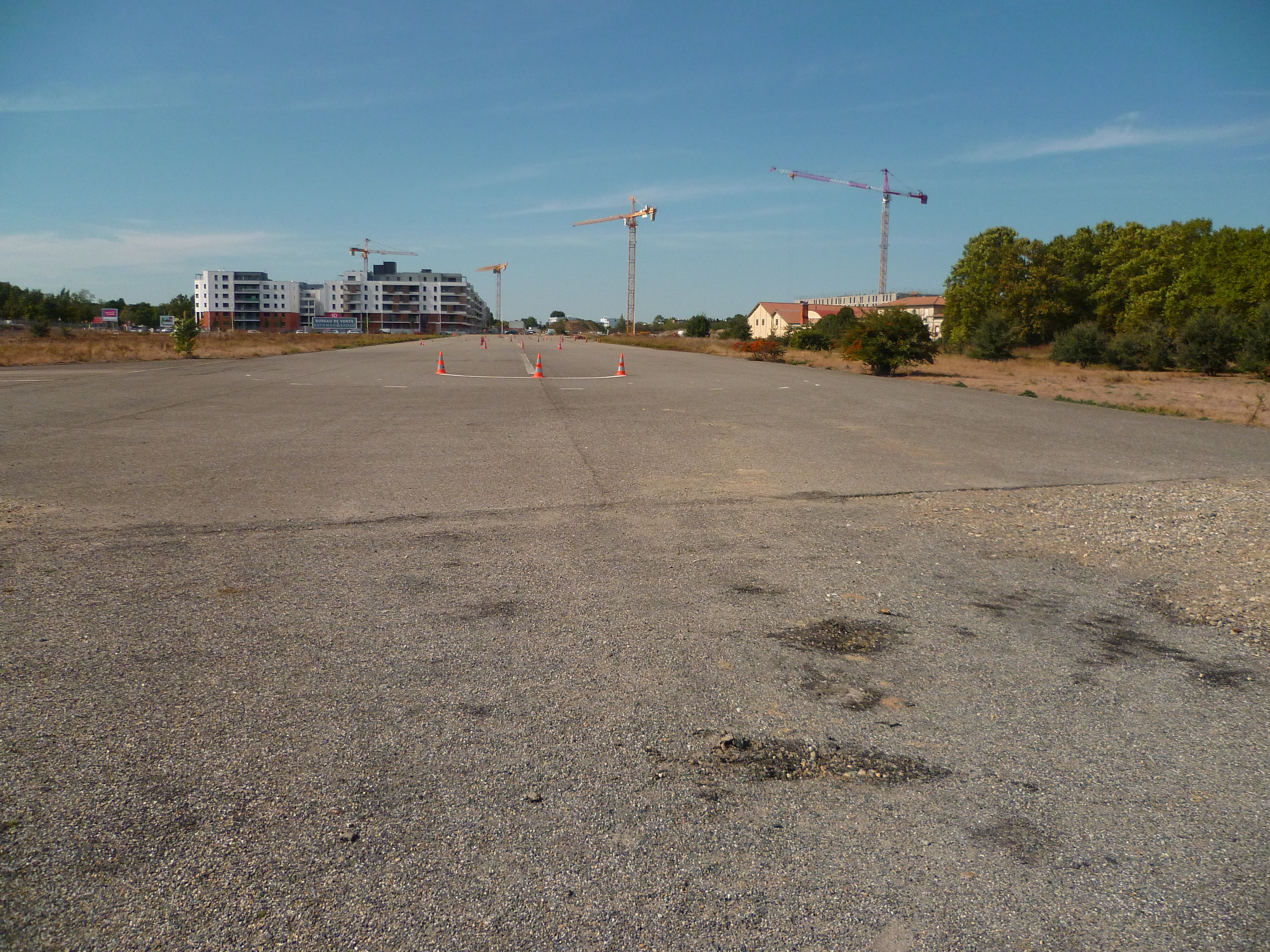
- The site in 2010: the old airfield runway and housing buildings under construction in the northern part (Saint-Exupéry district)

- Location within France Location within Occitanie
- Coordinates: 43°34′12″N 1°28′48″E
- Country: France
- Region: Occitanie
- Communes: Toulouse
- Postal code: 31400 (Toulouse)
- Website: toulouseaerospace.com

Toulouse Aerospace (Occitan: Aerospaç de Tolosa), formerly Montaudran Aerospace or Aerospace Campus (Campus Aeronautic), is a campus project linked to the aeronautics, space and embedded systems jobs and part of Aerospace Valley. Located in Toulouse in the Montaudran district, it will be built entirely by the Toulouse Métropole. Its surface area will be 40 hectares on the site of the former Toulouse-Montaudran airport which saw the beginnings of Aéropostale.

== Description ==
It is the town planner David Mangin who will direct the entire project, construction of which began in the first quarter of 2011. The Institut Clément Ader, from the Federal University of Toulouse Midi-Pyrénées, has set up within the walls of the Espace Clément Ader in March 2014, and was inaugurated in October.

Building B 612 of 26,140 m2 opened its doors on July 1, 2018.

Mangin's project was preferred for the place it gave to the preservation of the heritage of Aéropostale: ten hectares should be dedicated to it and certain historic buildings will be preserved (map room, Château Petit Raynal, etc.), to make the L'Envol des pionniers museum.

== Project ==
Like the Cancéropôle for oncology, this involves bringing together in the same place the main players in training and research in a field, in this case aeronautics and space:

- Bringing together the two Toulouse aeronautical grandes écoles of the GEA: ENAC and SUPAERO – as well as universities and university institutes located in the same geographical area: Toulouse III - Paul Sabatier University, INSA Toulouse and INPT. The Maison de la formation Jacqueline Auriol will thus bring together under the same roof all Toulouse training courses in mechanical and production engineering in the aeronautics and space sector (opening planned for January 2022).
- Group of 1000 researchers mainly from ONERA, CCR EADS, CNRS, and CNES.
- Creation of infrastructure necessary for the development of SMEs and provision of common services.

This project is a continuation of the Rangueil scientific complex where ISAE, ENAC, INSA Toulouse, Paul-Sabatier University, LAAS-CNRS, and CNES are already located, and it is close to important players such as Airbus, Airbus Defense and Space, Thales Alenia Space, Freescale, Latécoère, Siemens VDO Automotive, and Thales.

Photo gallery

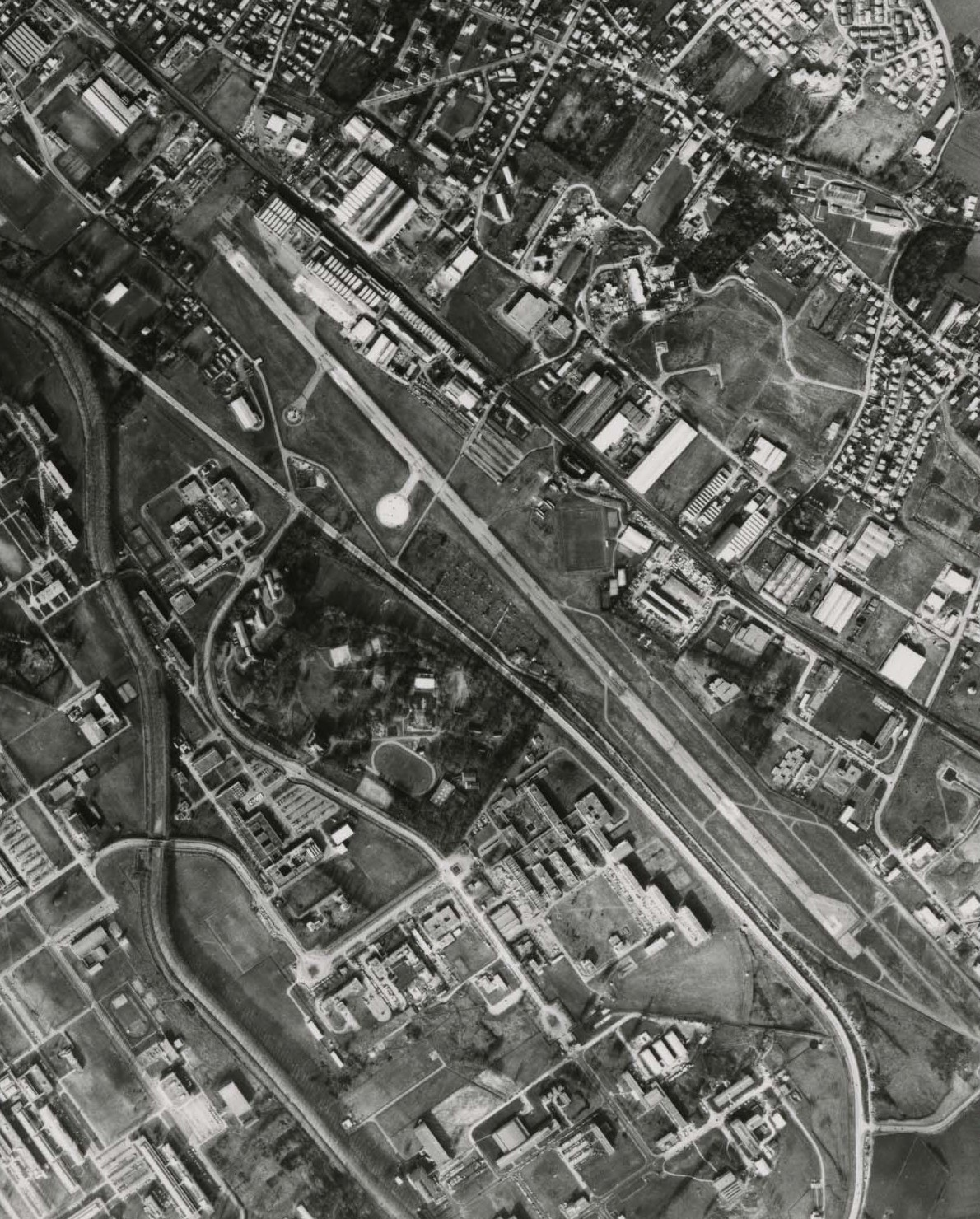
Aerial view of the site in 1977.

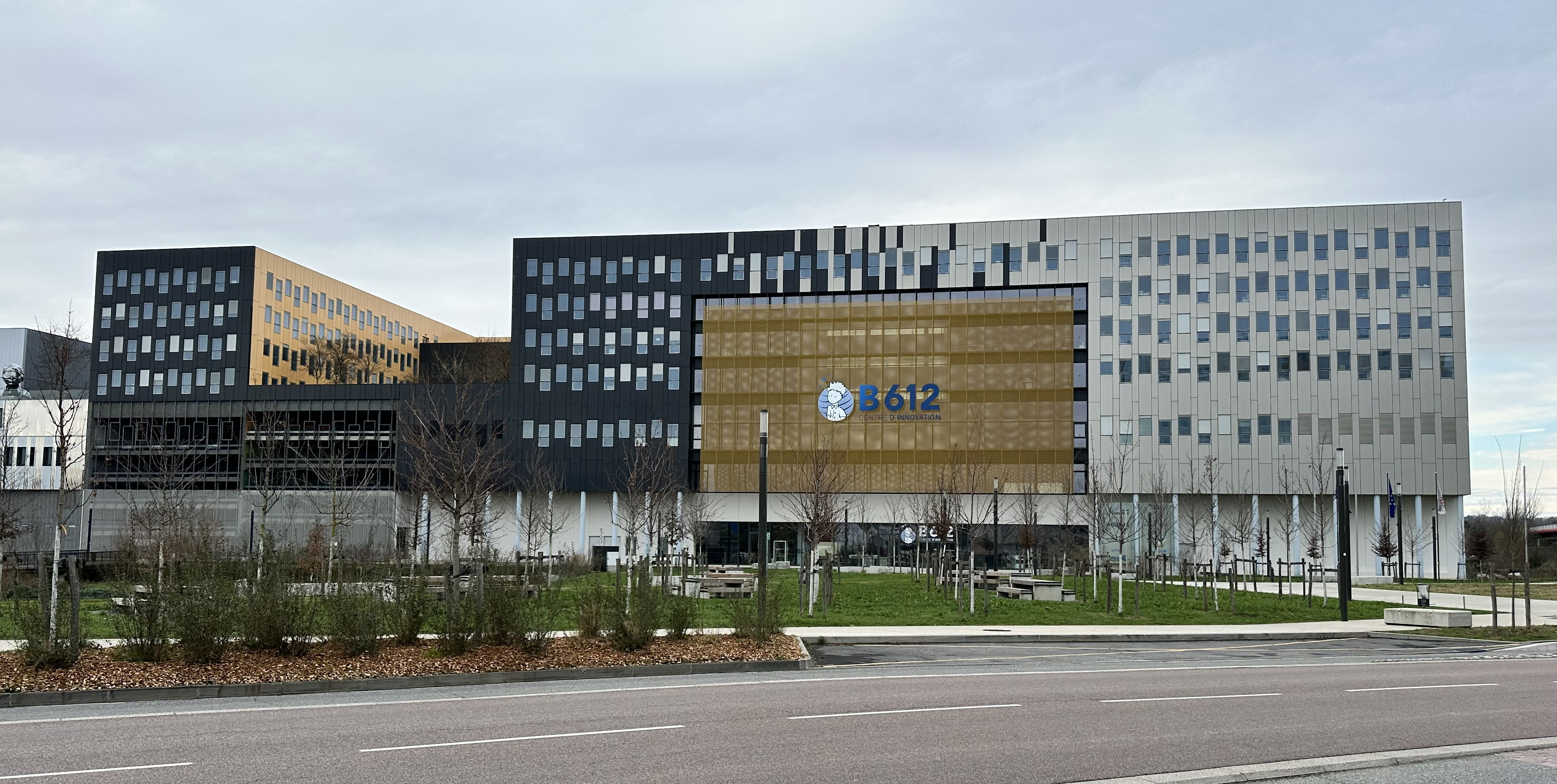
B612 building.

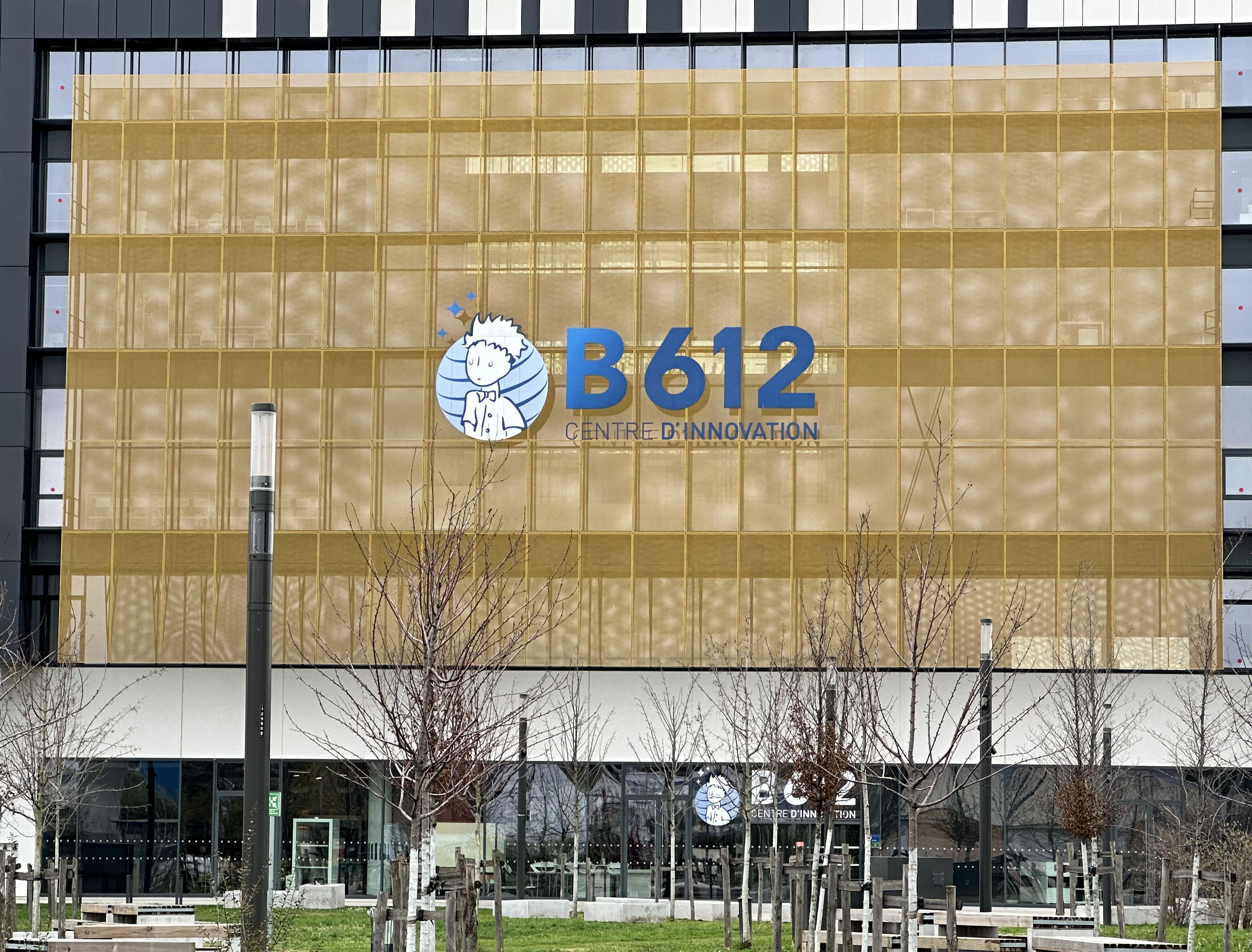
B612 building in details.

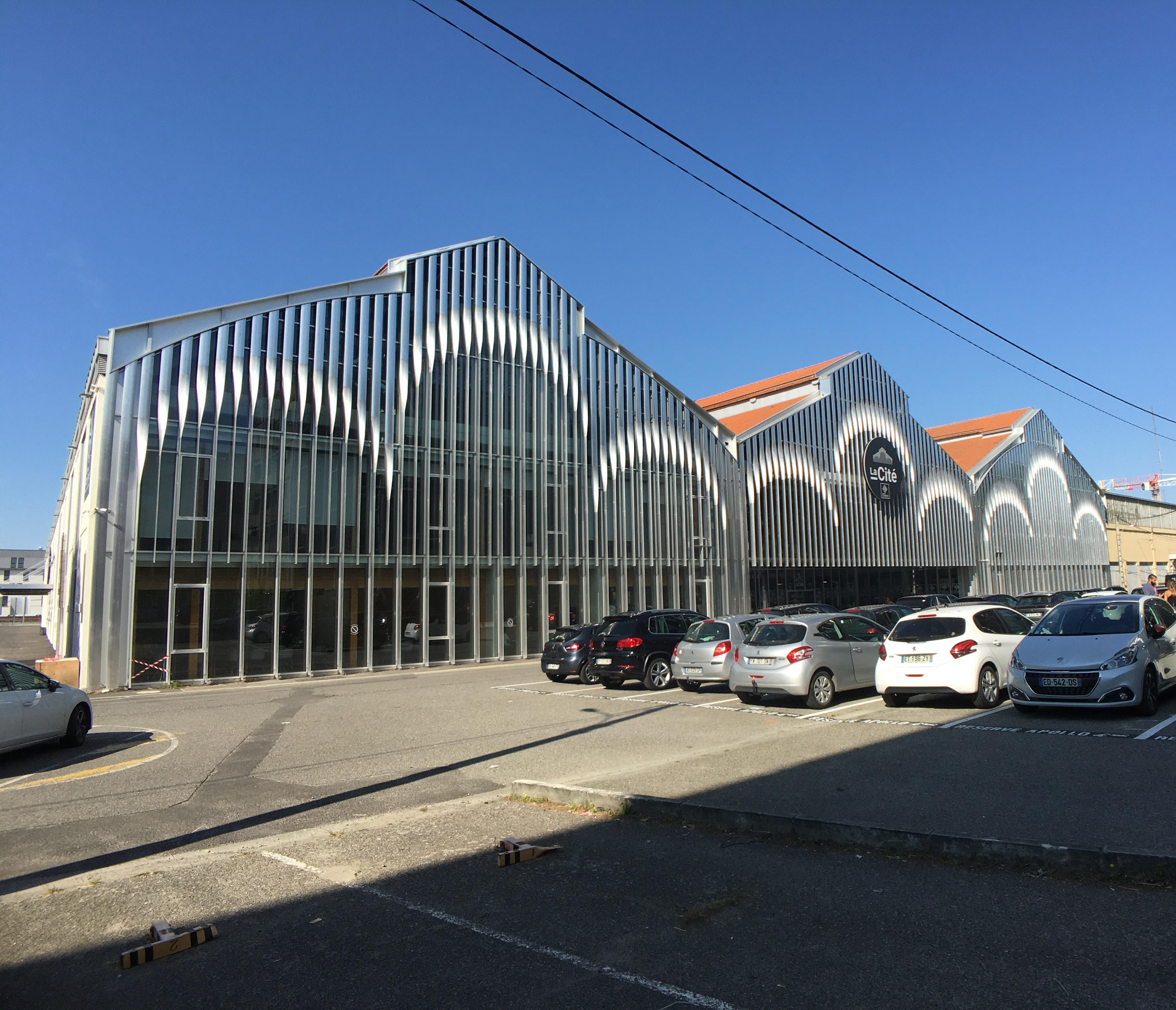
Halles de La Cité.

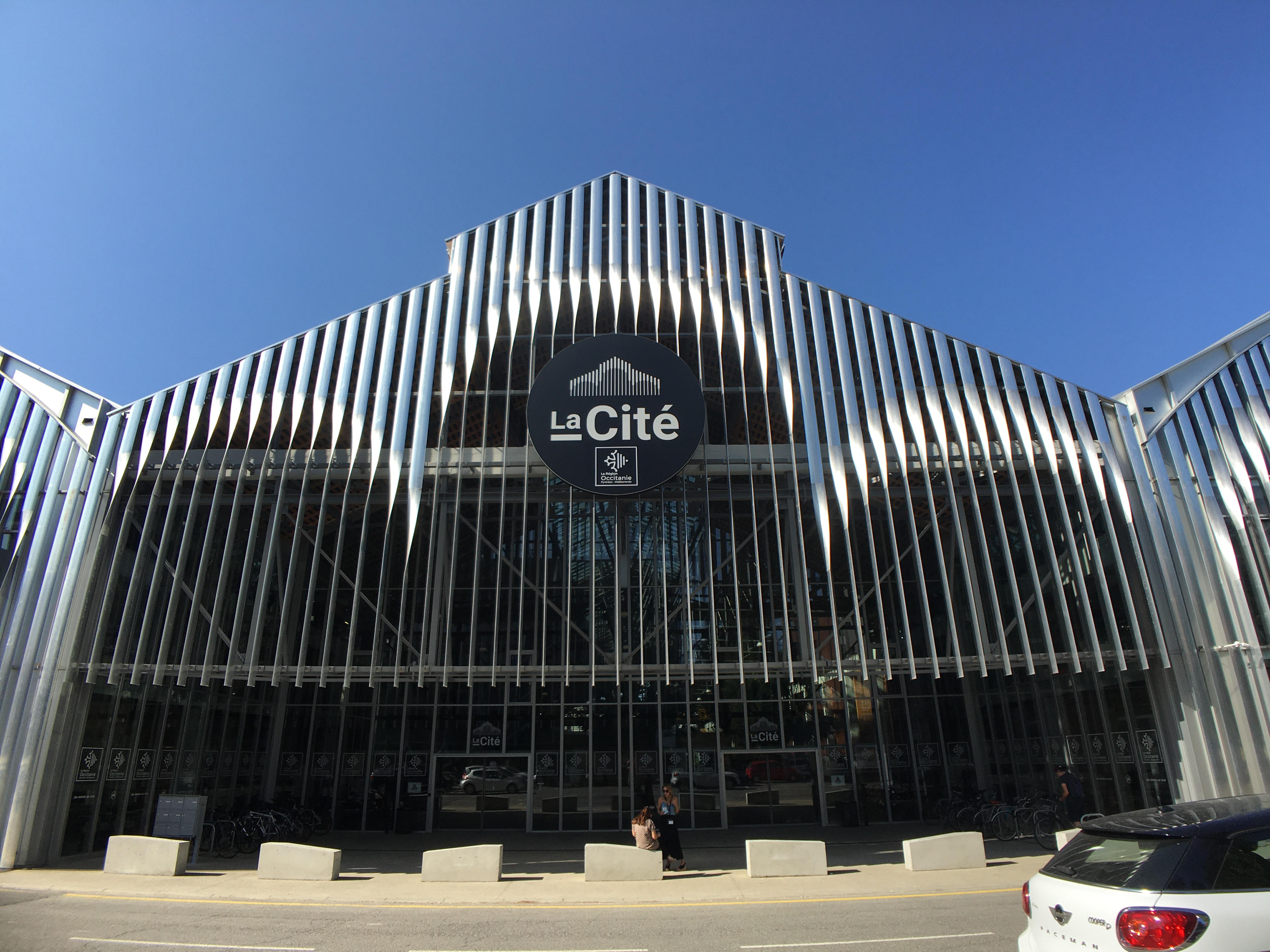
La Cité.

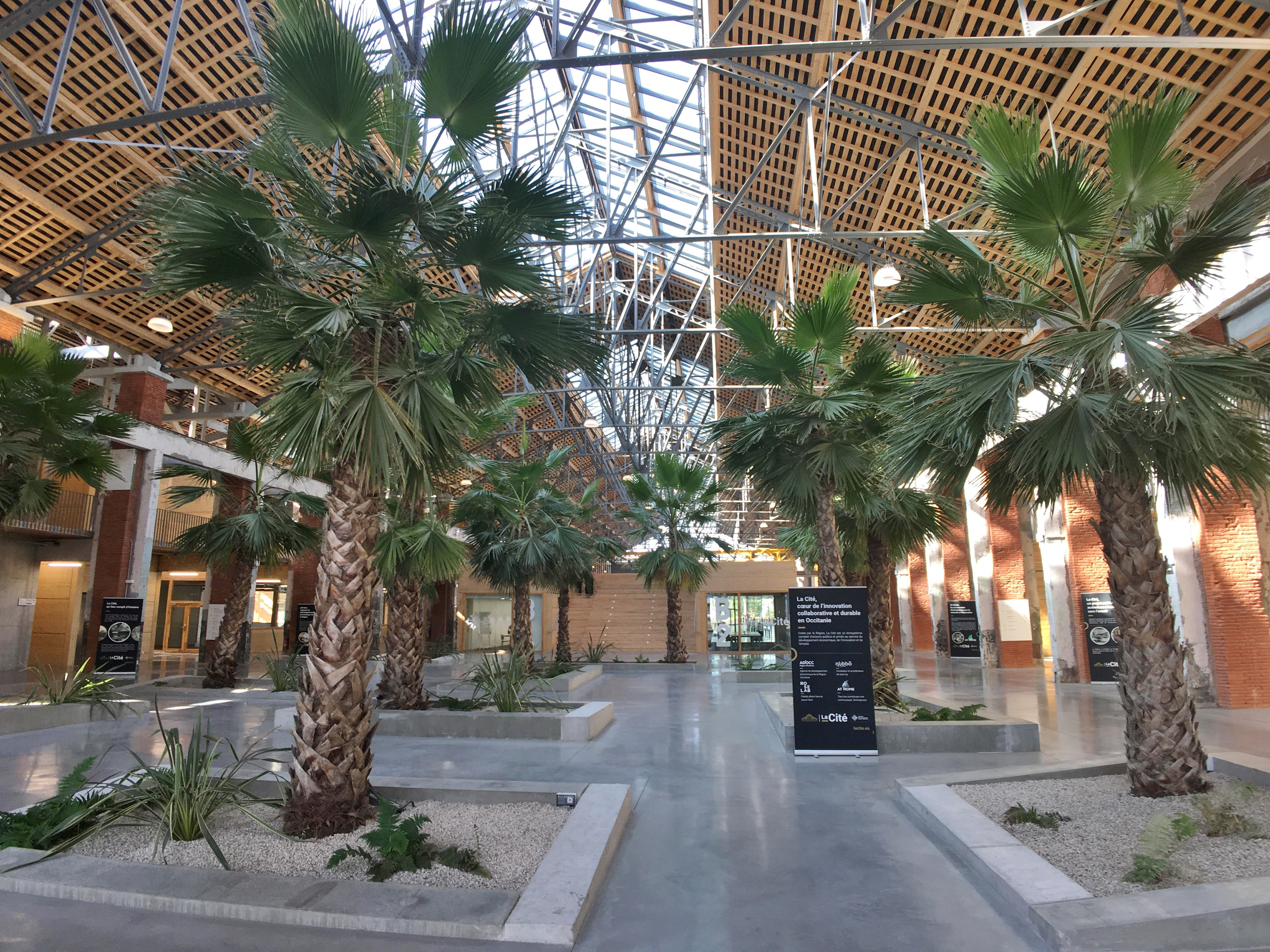
La Cité, inside.

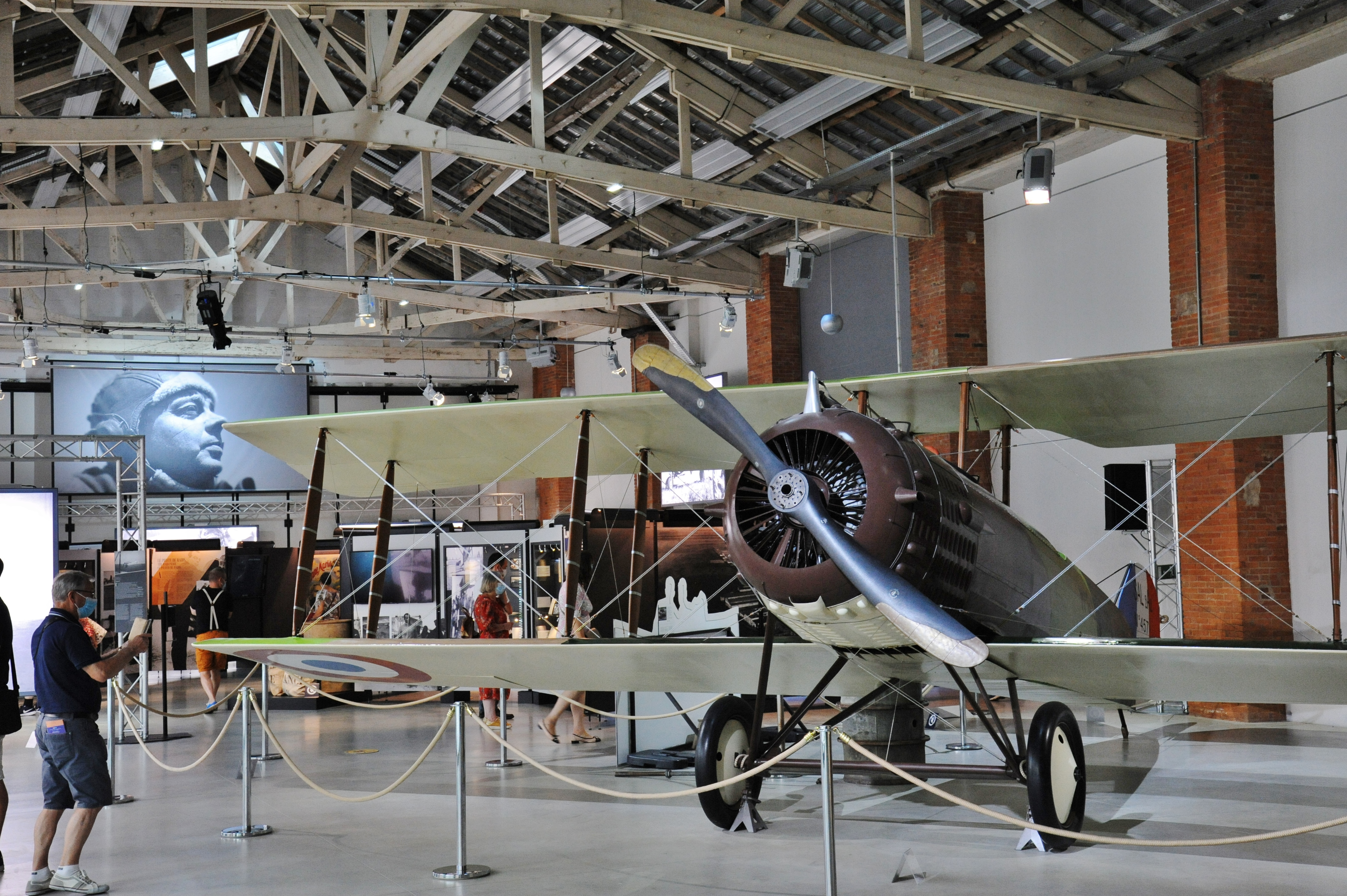
l'Envol des pionniers museum.

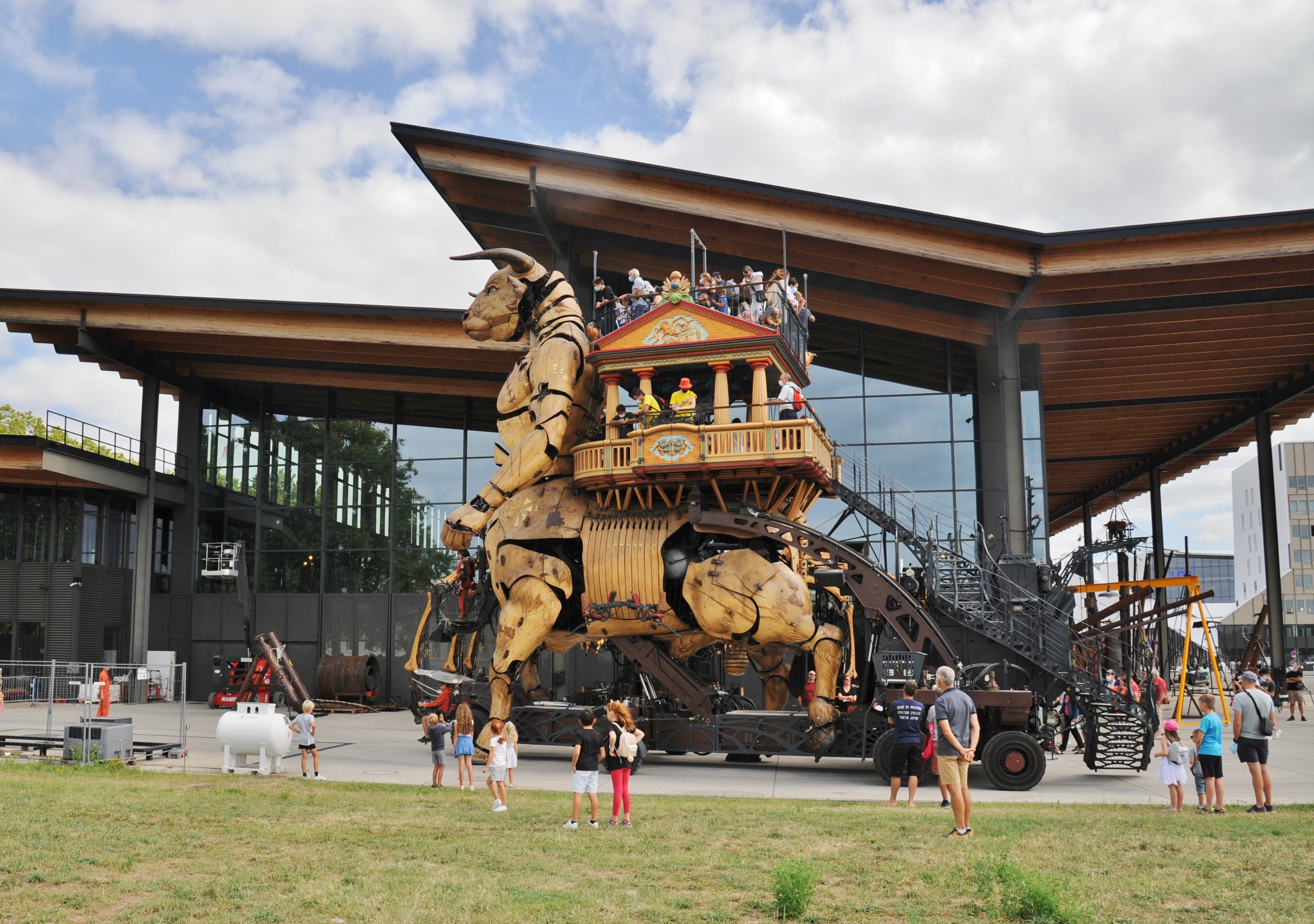
The Halle de La Machine and the Minotaure.
