= Halle de La Machine =

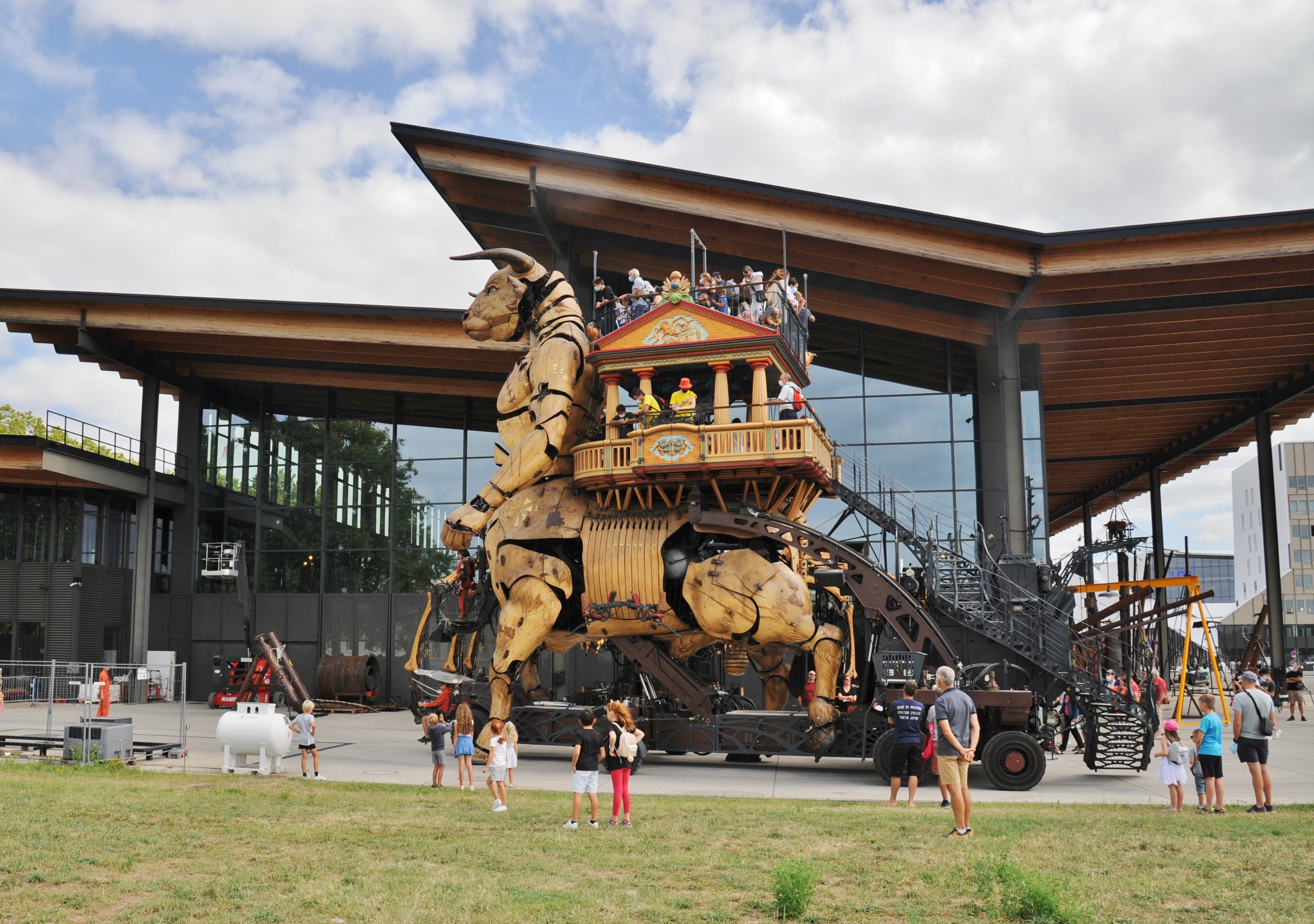
- Asterion the Minotaur outside the hall
- Established: 2018
- Location: Toulouse, France
- Coordinates: 43°34′22.9″N 1°28′41.0″E
- Website: www.halledelamachine.fr

The Halle de La Machine (Occitan: Hala de La Màquina) is a museum in the Montaudran suburb of Toulouse, France. It houses animatronic and interactive exhibits constructed by La Machine.

== Building ==
The museum is located in a 4,000-square-metre (43,000 sq ft) hall on the old runway of Toulouse-Montaudran Airport. With the L'Envol des pionniers museum, it is part of the Toulouse Aerospace La Piste des Géants project which saw the birth and glory days of Aéropostale.

== Attendance ==
In 2019, its first year of operation, La Halle de La Machine received 300,000 visitors.

== Collections ==
The museum includes Asterion the Minotaur, a 14-metre-tall (46 ft) anamatronic minotaur as well as 200 atypical show machines. From 1–4 November 2018, a street show – Le Gardien du Temple – was followed by some 900,000 people and included Ariane the Spider.

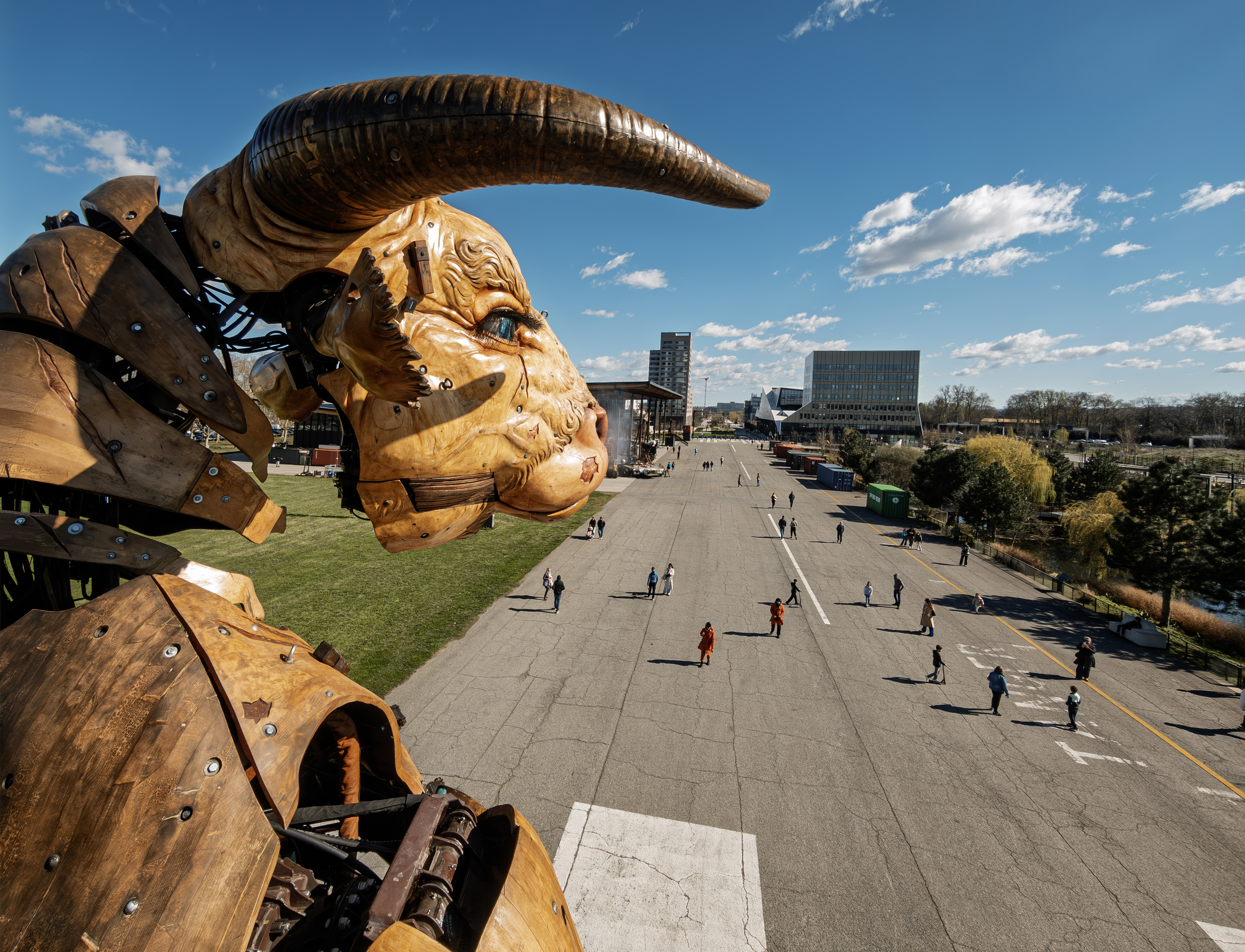
The Minotaur on the Trail of the Giants

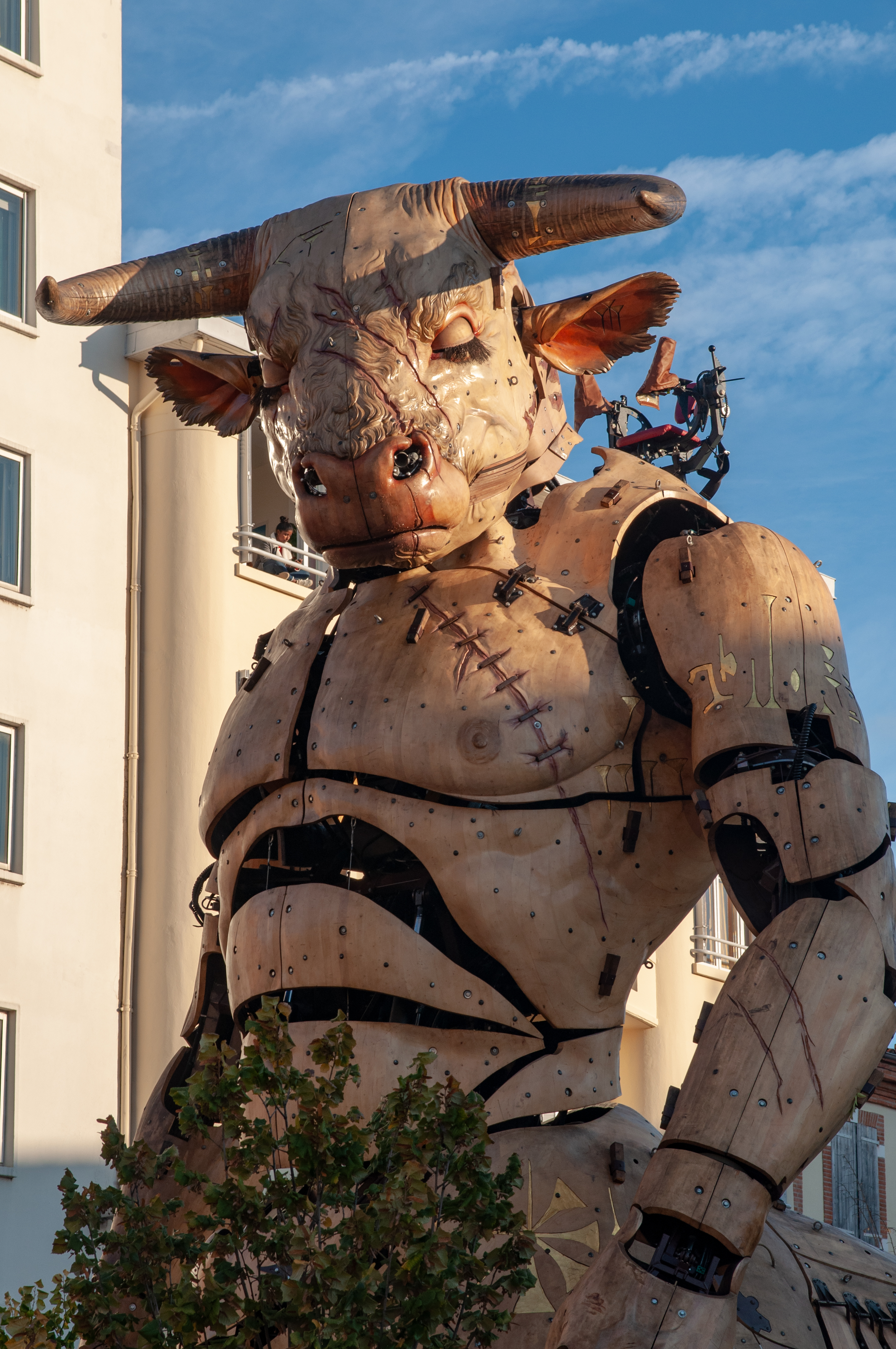
The Minotaur during the street show Le Guardian du Temple

== See also ==
- List of museums in France
