= L'Envol des pionniers =

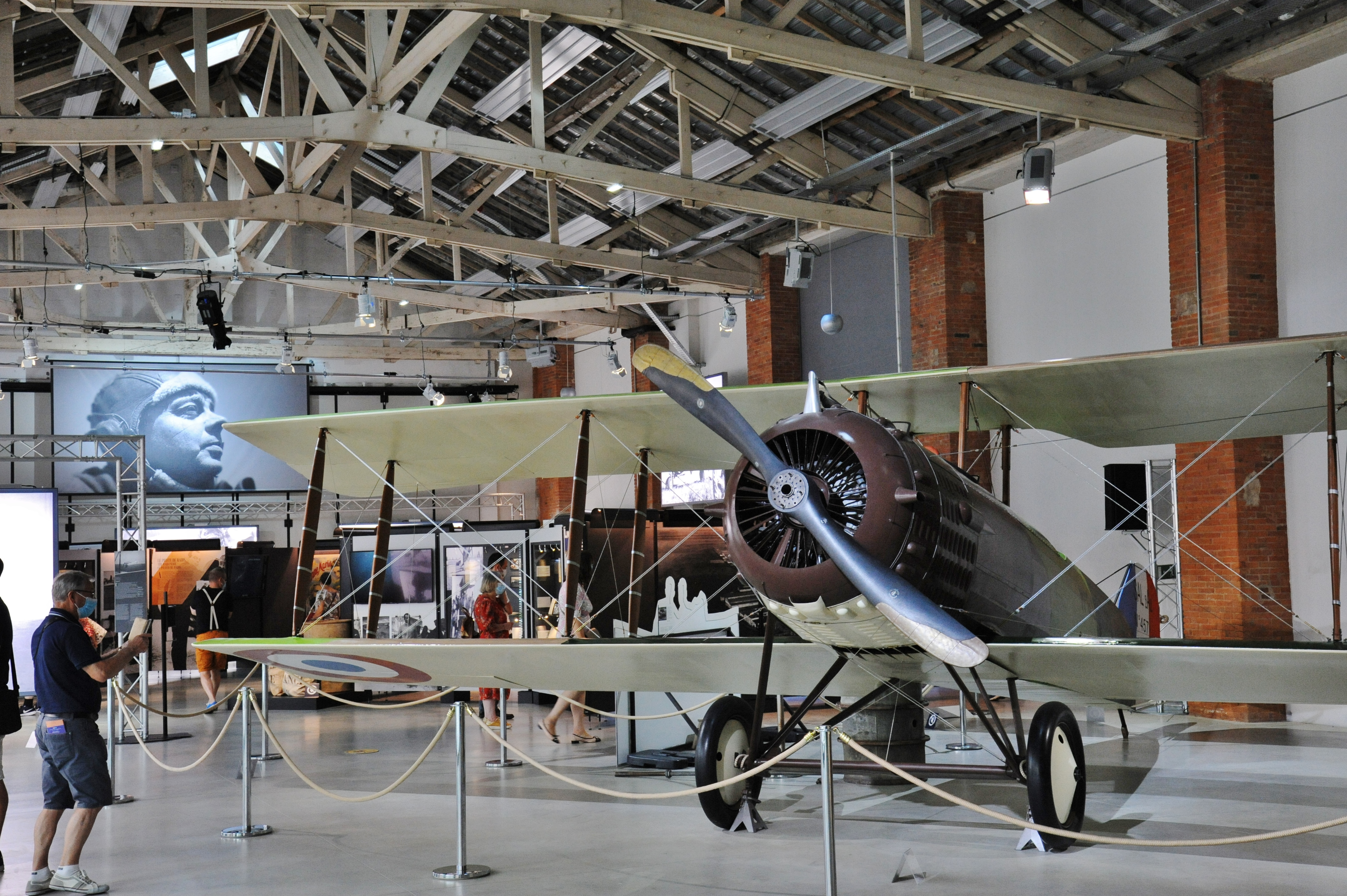
- Established: 22 December 2018
- Location: Toulouse, France
- Coordinates: 43°34′27.324″N 1°28′37.017″E
- Type: Aviation museum
- Visitors: 40,000
- Website: lenvol-des-pionniers.com

L'Envol des pionniers is a French aerospace museum that chronicles the adventure of Aéropostale and honors the aeronautical heritage of Toulouse. Located in the Montaudran district, it opened on December 22, 2018—almost 100 years after the inaugural civil flight to Barcelona.

In particular, it allows visitors to discover the equipment used by pilots such as Jean Mermoz, Henri Guillaumet, and Antoine de Saint-Exupéry during the epic journeys of the Aéropostale and Latécoère air routes.

The museum is situated directly across from the Rangueil scientific complex, home to ENAC (Europe's largest aeronautical university) and SUPAERO (the world's oldest aeronautical university).

== History ==
Located on the runway of the former Toulouse-Montaudran airport, it is part of the Toulouse Aerospace "La Piste des Géants" project, which aims to showcase the glory days of Aéropostale and the Halle de La Machine. The museum’s beginnings were difficult; it owes its existence solely to the perseverance of associations whose campaign finally succeeded after a twenty-year struggle.

== See also ==
- List of aerospace museums
