= Pierre de Saint Roman =

French officer and aviator (1891–1927)

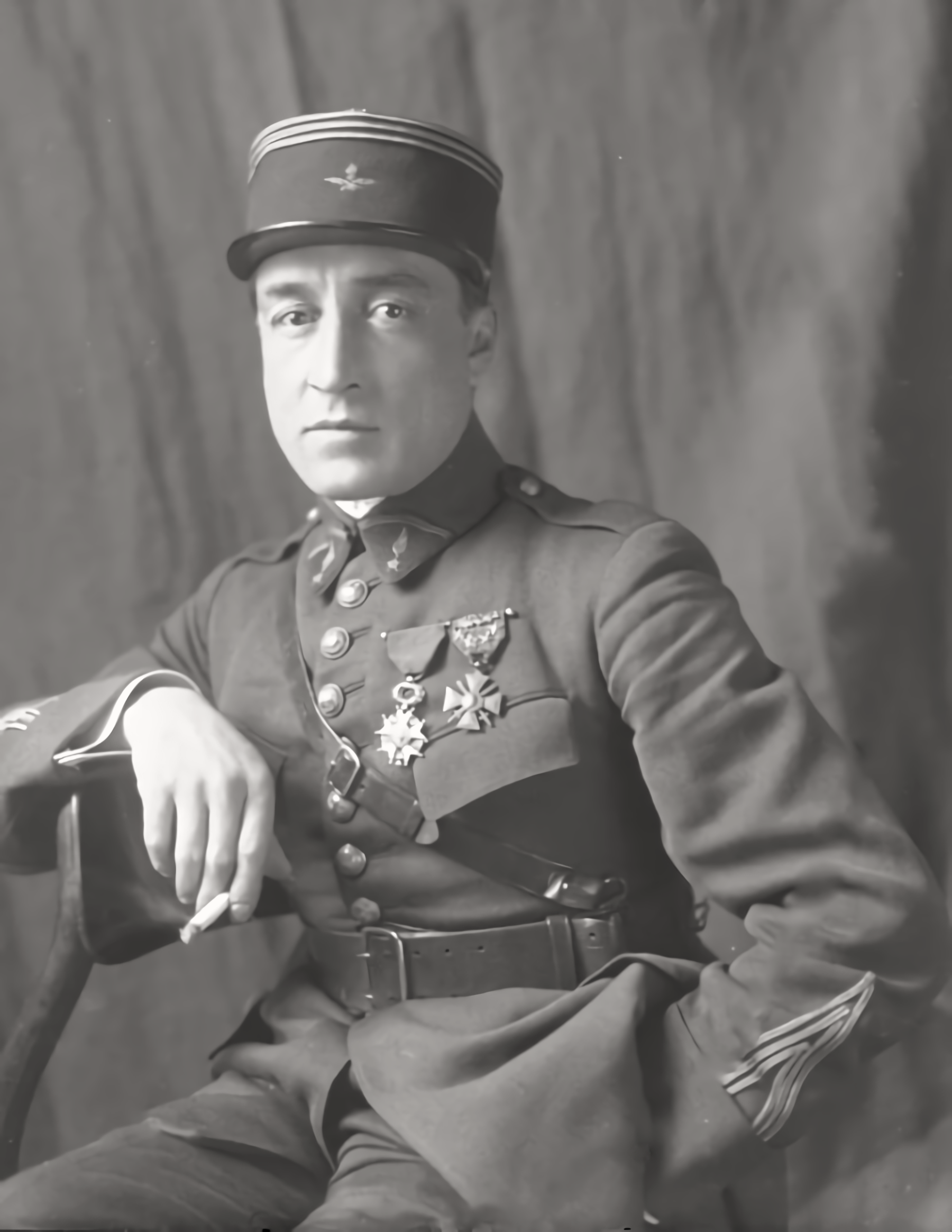
- Portrait of de Saint Roman in the Air force
- Born: December 22, 1891; Toul, France
- Died: May 6, 1927 (aged 35) Brazil
- Rank: Captain
- Awards: Legion of Honour, knight; Croix de guerre 1914-1918 (France) (5 citations)

Pierre de Saint Roman was a French military officer and aviator known as the first man to cross the South Atlantic by air. Along two companions, he disappeared during the attempt in May 1927.

== Life and career ==
=== Family background ===
He was born Jacques Raymond Pierre de Serre de Saint Roman, on December 23, 1891, in Toul (Meurthe-et-Moselle), where his father was stationed, and was the seventh of nine children of Émeric de Serre (the 3rd), Count of Saint Roman (1844–1899), an infantry battalion commander, and Pauline de Castelbajac (1857–1941) ). Originally from the Cévennes, the family de Serre de Saint Roman descended from the surviving Nobles of the Robe (1744), and counted a peer of France among their members, named Alexis-Jacques de Serre de Saint Roman, as well as several army officers, also members of the Legion of Honour and the Royal and Military Order of Saint-Louis.

=== The Great War ===
Pierre was mobilized into the French 10th Hussars as a Sergeant. He distinguished himself in September 1914 at the first Battle of the Aisne, then on the Yser front and was given two military citations. He joined the infantry at his request and was assigned to the 347th Infantry Regiment, where he was promoted to second lieutenant in March 1915. At the Battle of Verdun in June 1916, he was distinguished again and mentions appear of his "imperturbable calm in combat" and his " energy". He was subsequently given two additional citations, including one at the Army unit, which run as follows :

Young officer assigned to the infantry at his request. Vigorous, energetic, smart, took command of a company in very tricky circumstances; imposed himself on men through bravery bordering on recklessness. Vigorously led his company to attack a village, inflicting serious losses on the enemy. His crawling along the enemy line to gather valuable information for the further development of the fight demonstrated exemplar bravery.

— Ordre n°284 de la XIe Armée,1916, 07, 13

He was consequently appointed lieutenant, as an appreciation of his conduct under the fire in Verdun. Resuming intelligence missions in the light cavalry, Pierre was entrusted with the command of his battalion's Free Group, and was consequently granted a fifth citation.

=== Awards and decorations ===
- Legion of Honour : knighted on 16 June 1920
- Croix de guerre 1914-1918 : 5 citations (1 at the Army unit, 1 at the army Corps unit, 2 at the Division unit, 1 at the Regiment unit)
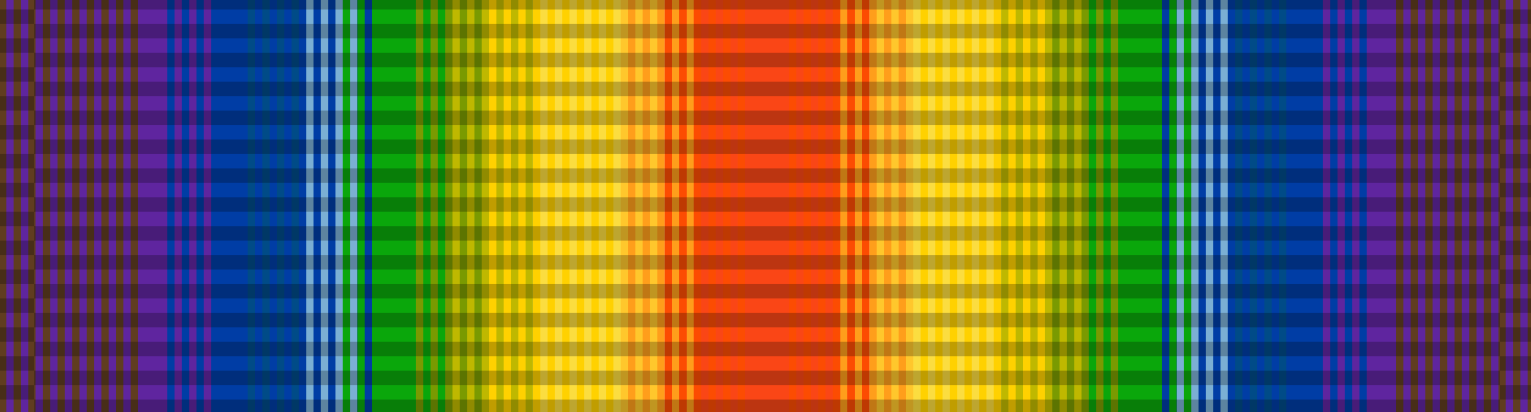
- 1914–1918 Inter-Allied Victory medal (law of 20 July 1922)
- 1914–1918 Commemorative war medal (France) (law of 23 June 1920)
- Commemorative medal for the battle of Verdun (1916)

=== The call of the sky ===
He was then transferred to the 348th Infantry Regiment after the 347th was disbanded, after which he asked to be posted to the fledgling air force. Entering as a student in piloting in March 1918, he obtained his license (n°15338) in Pau in August of the same year on a Caudron G.3, after performing 83 landings and 35 hours of flying time:.

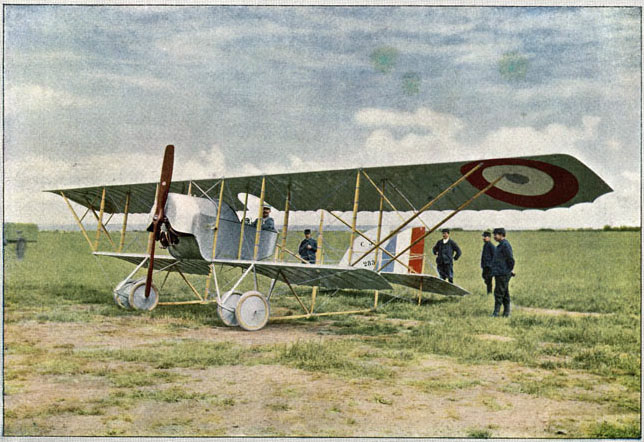
Caudron G3

After leaving his fighter firing school, he did not have time to take part in further battles before the Armistice of 11 November 1918. The commandant praised his passage at the Vineuil military aviation school

"An officer of great modesty through which the finest military qualities and high morals shine through. An upright character in whom one can have complete confidence. Of boundless devotion, Lieutenant de Saint Roman is a military man in every sense of the word".

— Commandant Michel Campagne, 1918

He was assigned to Escadrille Spa.69 (Groupement de chasse 11) after graduating from the Biscarosse fighter firing school. He was made a knight of the Legion of Honour two years later (16 June 1920), as a recognition for acts of war. Experiencing the delaying tactics of the Army and the Navy headquarters during this post-war period, which he judged were both engaged in quarrels to retain their control over the military aviation, Pierre was assigned to jobs that did not satisfy his urge to fly, and he predicted that the future of aeronautics would arise in civil aviation. As a result, he asked for three years' unpaid leave in 1924, and took the commercial management of the firm Descamps aviation. He asked for his leave of absence to be renewed for a further 3 years in order to complete his project.

=== Crossing the South Atlantic ===
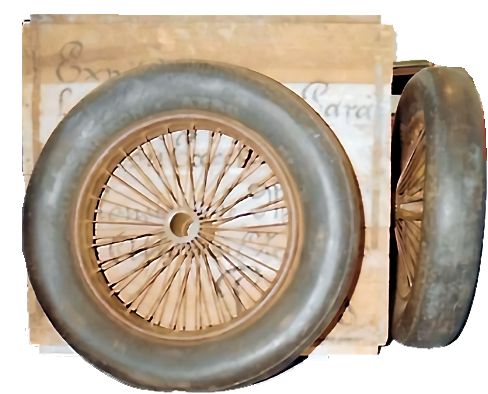
Landing gear of the Farman F.60 Goliath found off the Brazilian coast (Paris Air Show, 1977)

Because he was aware that he did not have the means to fulfil his ambitions, he approached the first Maison de l'Amérique Latine (house of Latin America), M.A.L., to deal with the various diplomatic, logistical and financial aspects of his South Atlantic crossing project. A Paris-Amérique Latine (P.A.L.) committee was set up in Paris to plan and finance the expedition. The Farman company supplied a Goliath aircraft powered by two Lorraine-Dietrich engines. In order to obtain approval for the flight, the aeronautical authorities required Farman to fit the aircraft with floats under the fuselage. Saint Roman decided to cross the South Atlantic Ocean with the plane because the cost of transporting the aircraft by ship to South America was too high. The aircraft left Le Bourget, piloted by Maurice Drouhin and taking on board Hervé-Marcel Mouneyrès, an experienced co-pilot, and Ernest Mathis, the mechanic. At Fréjus, floats were fitted to the Goliath F61. After landing at the Étang de Berre, the crew carried out successful tests under full load. Straight after, they took the Argentinian journalist Carlos Del Carril on board, who was dispatched by the Buenos Aires daily La Prensa, and the plane headed for Casablanca, where final preparations were made for the flight across the Atlantic. During the take-off for Agadir, the plane was hit by a wave, which caused damage to a float, as well as to one of the engines and the fuel tank. Pierre de Saint Roman decided to remove the floats and put the wheels back on the plane. These repairs were carried out in dry dock. This configuration had the advantage of reducing weight on the aircraft and allowing it to carry more fuel. However, this decision also meant that flight approval was withdrawn. As a result, the mechanic Ernest Mathis resigned and was replaced by Louis Petit, after which the aircraft was put back on wheels as decided in order to take advantage of this lighter configuration. The plane left for Agadir then hopped to Saint-Louis in Senegal. Despite the suppression of approval, Pierre de Saint Roman and his crew decided to leave anyway.
On 5 May 1927 at 6.30am, the plane took off from Saint-Louis carrying 4,500 litres of fuel and 300 litres of oil, enough to allow for a 28-hour flying range, while the crossing was forecast to take only 22 hours. The crew followed the coast as far as Dakar, where they turned and headed south-west. Their radio signals were picked up three times, until 10.38 am, then went silent.
On the very next day, a Brazilian rescue mission set off in search of the crew off the archipelago of Fernando de Noronha, and the islands of Saint Peter and Saint Paul, in accordance with the flight estimate, but returned without any finding. A month and a half later, Brazilian fishermen found a raft at sea off the mouth of the Amazon River, near Belem, made with a piece of wing and the two wheels, among other debris. The newspaper of Buenos Aires, La Nación, published the news and hope returned. An expert report made by two engineers confirmed that the wheels and associated plate did indeed belong to the Goliath F61. The report also stated that the wheels could only have been dismantled on dry land. Searches were then resumed, but the outcome proved as disappointing as before. The mystery of the disappearance of Pierre de Serre de Saint Roman and his crew was never solved

== Tributes ==
An alley way in Toulouse was named Allée Pierre de Saint Roman in the Montaudran district, which is a landmark in the history of the French civil aviation.

A street in Fourquevaux named "allée Pierre de Saint Roman" was inaugurated on 15 October 2022.

A plaque was placed at the base of the war memorial in Fourquevaux

A street was named Rua Saint Roman in remembrance, located between the beaches of Copacabana and Ipanema.
