= Alain-Michel Boudet =

French biologist (born 1940)

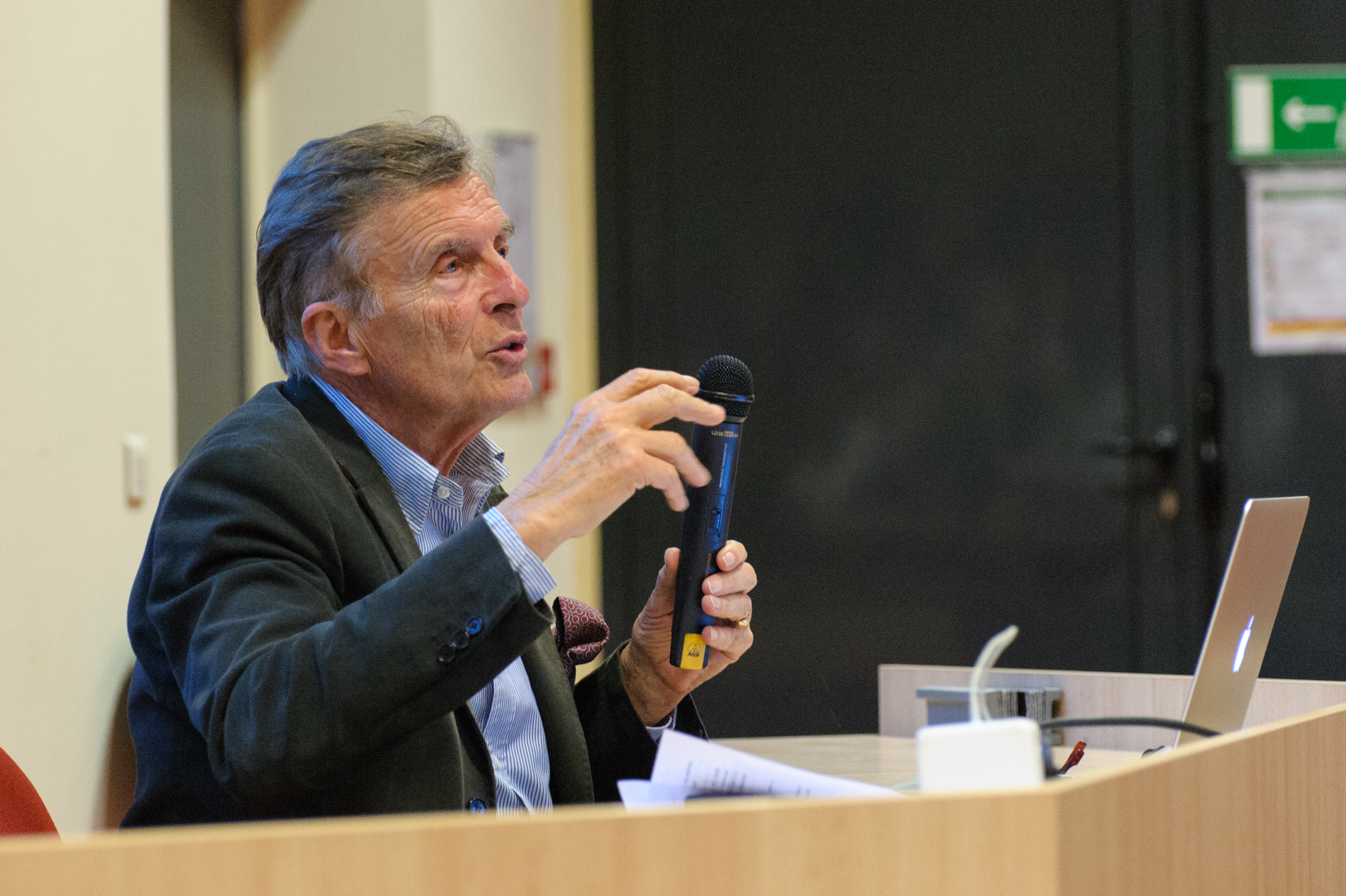
Alain-Michel Boudet at a conference in Toulouse, in February 2017

Alain-Michel Boudet (born 16 March 1940) is a French biological researcher. He is a member of the French Academy of sciences and the French Academy of technologies.

== Studies ==
Alain-Michel Boudet began his studies at the Paul Sabatier University in Toulouse. He continued his studies at several international institutions: the University of East Anglia (1973), the University of California at Davis (1978), the University of Fribourg (1982), and the University of Ghent (1991).

== Career ==
Boudet is the initiator of the Centre Pierre Potier Itav which is located in the Toulouse oncopole and whose objective is to encourage interdisciplinary collaborations and to bring private and public research closer together.

== Other functions ==
- Advisor to the board of directors of the association Science Animation
- President of the Academy of sciences, Inscriptions and Belles-lettres of Toulouse

== Scientific works ==
Boudet has had more than 160 articles in peer-reviewed journals, several books published, and five patents, He is the organizer of several international colloquia.

== Bibliography ==
- Voyage Au Coeur De La Matiere Plastique : Les microstructures des polymères, CNRS, 2003, ISBN 9782271061607
