= Oncopole of Toulouse =

French research institute in cancer

Coordinates: 43°33′47″N 1°25′29″E

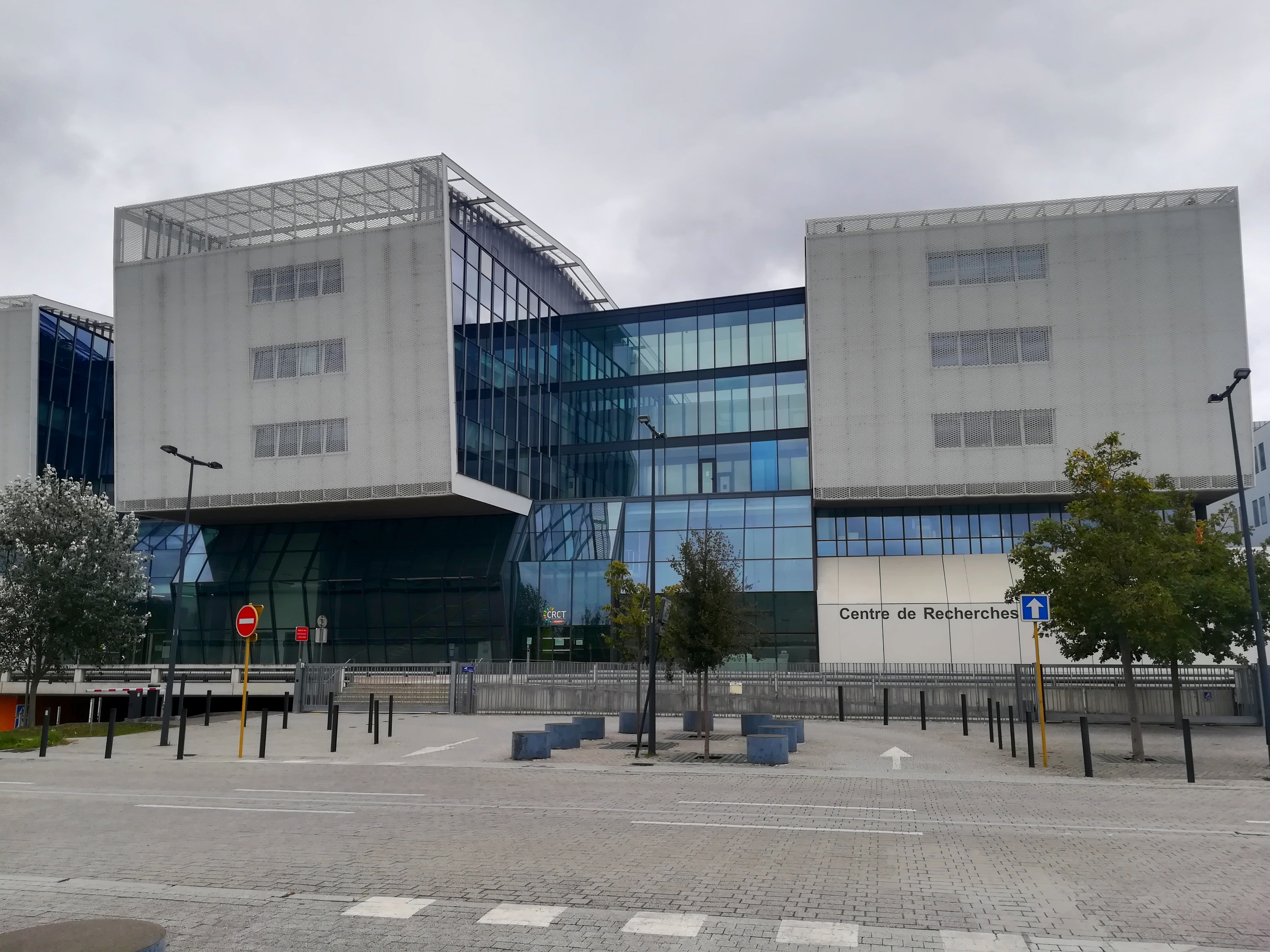
View of the CRCT (Centre de Recherche en Cancérologie de Toulouse)

The Campus de cancérologie de Toulouse (Oncopole de Toulouse) is a cancer research center with a European dimension. Located south of Toulouse, in the Lafourguette district on the symbolic site of the explosion of the AZF factory in 2001, the campus welcomes private and public actors with the aim of harmonizing their research for the fight against cancer.

The campus was developed by the Toulouse Métropole, in partnership with the general council of Haute-Garonne, the regional council of Occitania, the French State and Europe. The building has been designed by the architect Yann Padlewski from the Jean-Paul Viguier architectural firm.

== Notable Doctors ==
- Alain-Michel Boudet, a French biological researcher
