= Montaudran =

Coordinates: 43°34′28″N 1°29′26″E

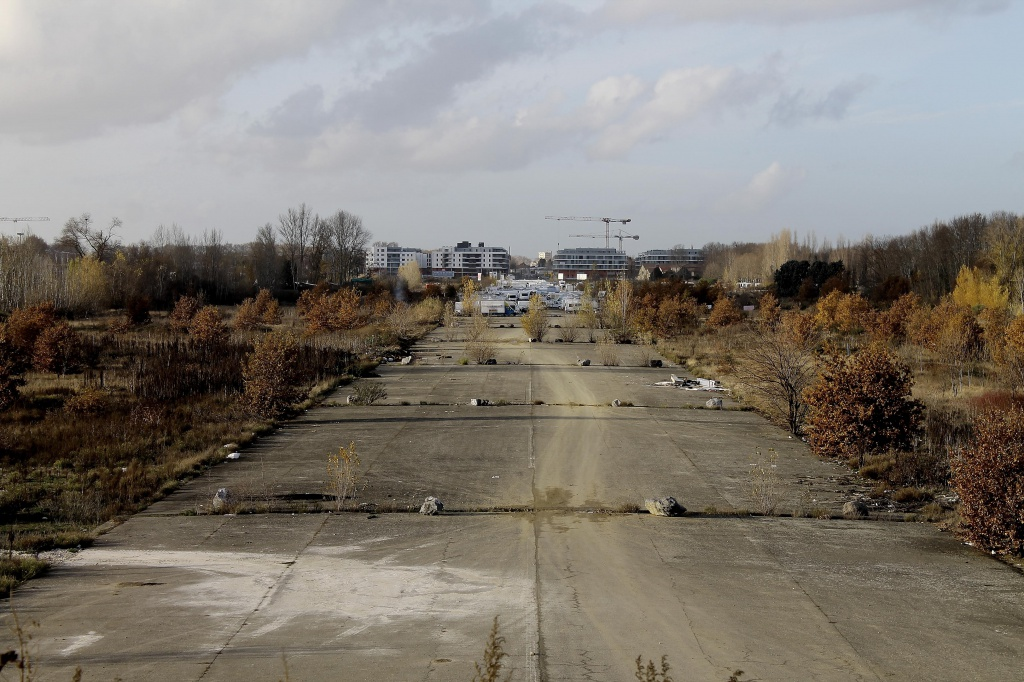
Montaudran

Montaudran (French pronunciation: [mɔ̃todʁɑ̃]) is a suburb of Toulouse situated to the south east of the city (secteur 5), by the Hers-Mort river. It is notable thanks to the Aéropostale company and its aerodrome which was the base for the aeronautical pioneers between 1917 and 1933 who established the first commercial air routes with postal flights to Casablanca, Dakar... and on to South America.

500 m further north is a group of two primary schools (originally one boys', one girls') and a nursery school named after one of the Aéropostale pilots, Henri Guillaumet.

Montraudan is also the home of a well-frequented sports association with a rugby section.

== Aerodrome ==
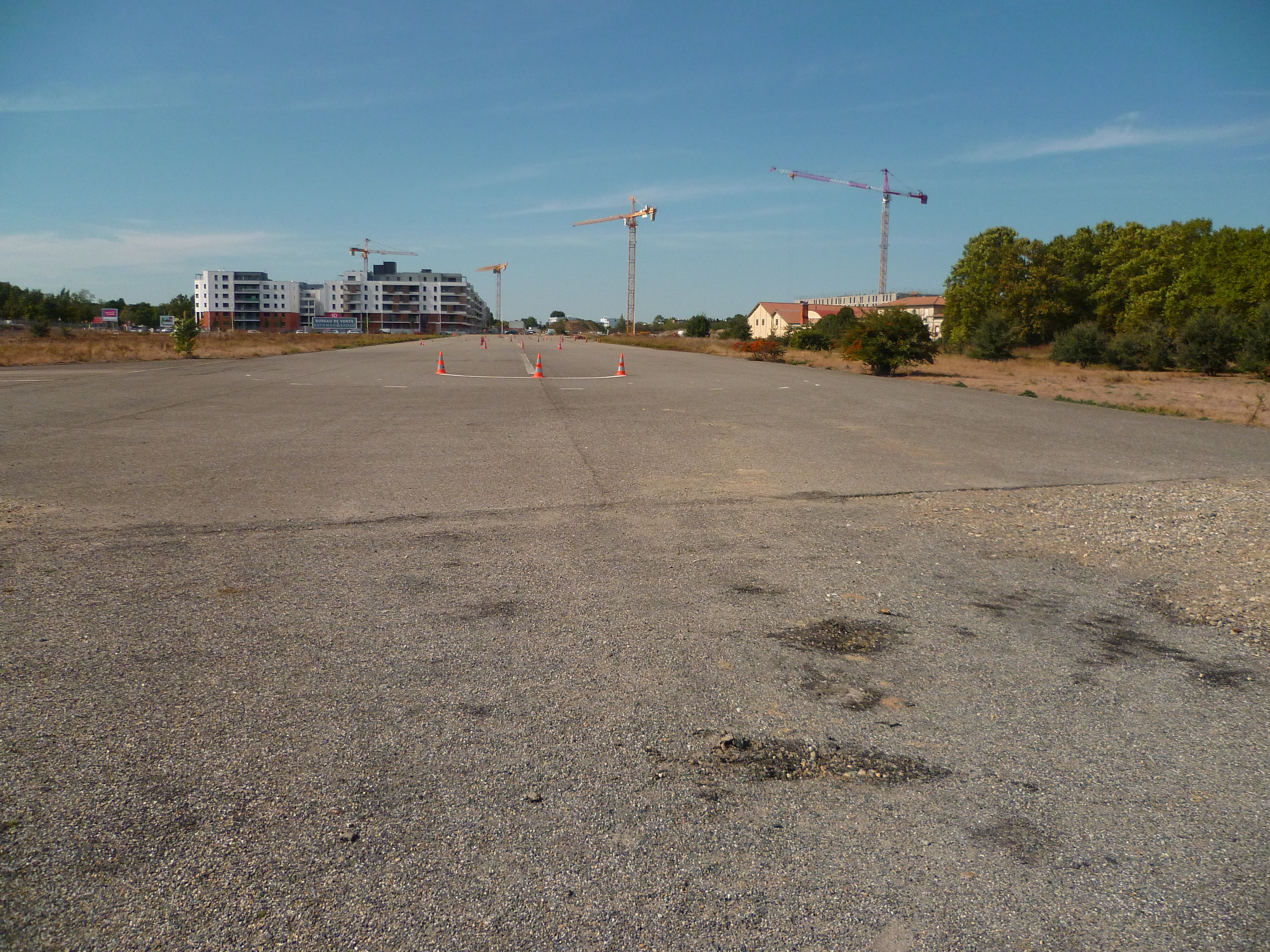
Aerodrome runway in 2010.

Toulouse-Montaudran Airport, disused since 1 January 2004.

The runway is crossed by a road and is situated to the south of and parallel to the Toulouse-Narbonne railway track. Until the 1970s, the Breguet aircraft factories used it as a take off and landing test runway for aircraft under repair (manufacture having moved to Colomiers). The runway was taken out of use and has been obstructed by blocks of concrete where the road crosses it. The last flight of an aeroplane from Montaudran was on 18 December 2003.

== Urbanism ==
Montaudran is undergoing urban renewal. Housing is being built to prepare the area to receive the Toulouse Aerospace campus to be built on the old runway between the railway and the ring road. It is expected to be the most productive aeronautical campus in Europe, and the future base of the Galileo satellite navigation system.

== Public transport ==
Montaudran is served by:

- the SNCF Gare de Montaudran
- bus lines 51, 68 and 108 operated by Tisséo

There is a possibility of a new transport link by the Toulouse tramway.
