= Toulouse-Montaudran Airport =

Former airport of Toulouse, France (1917–2003)

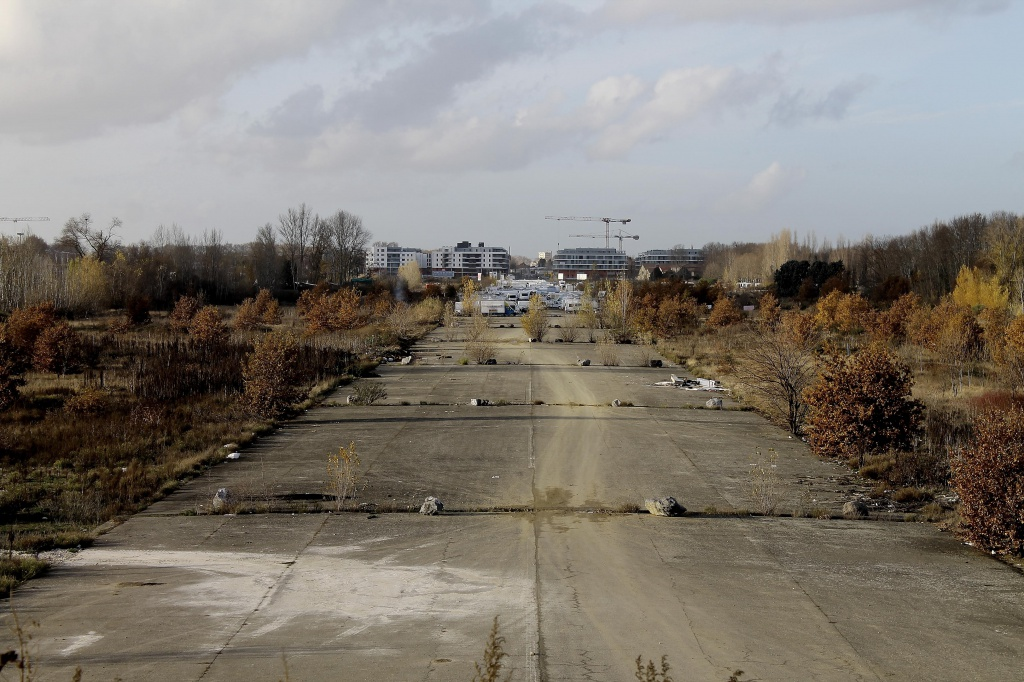
- The former airport runway in 2012
- IATA: XYT; ICAO: LFIO

Summary
- Airport type: Defunct
- Serves: Toulouse
- Location: Montaudran
- Opened: 1917
- Closed: 18 December 2003
- Coordinates: 43.5704107°N 1.4808798°E
- Interactive map of Toulouse-Montaudran Airport

Toulouse-Montaudran Airport (IATA: XYT, ICAO: LFIO) was a French airport located in the district of Montaudran in the municipality of Toulouse in the Haute-Garonne department of the region of Occitanie.

== History ==
Created in 1917 by Pierre-Georges Latécoère, it became a centre for civil aviation and the aeronautics industry. In 1918 "Lignes Aériennes Latécoère" was created, and in 1927 it became the departure point for Aéropostale with pilots based at the airport including Jean Mermoz, Henri Guillaumet, Paul Vachet and Antoine de Saint-Exupéry.

Latécoère, successor to Aéropostale, until the 1970s Breguet, used the airport for repairs to their aircraft. Eventually, Air France Industries used the site for maintenance of their aircraft until 18 December 2003, the date the last flight left the airport.

== See also ==
- Toulouse Aerospace
- List of airports in France
- Directorate General for Civil Aviation (France)
