= Technical Service Bulletin =

Document of recommended procedure for repairing a vehicle

Technical Service Bulletins (TSBs) are document recommended procedures for repairing vehicles issued by a vehicle manufacturer when there are several occurrences of an unanticipated problem. TSBs can range from vehicle-specific to covering entire product lines and break down the specified repair into a step-by-step process. While sometimes written by engineers employed by OEMs, the majority are authored by the first automotive technician to come up with a repair procedure. Because certain problems may have more than one cause and there is sometimes more than one way to fix a problem, there may be more than one TSB for the same problem.

A major difference between a product recall and a TSB in the automotive industry is that a recall usually evolves out of safety issues at the behest of an organization such as the US National Highway Traffic Safety Administration (NHTSA). The ensuing recall maintenance/repair work is usually done at no charge to the car owner, regardless of the car's warranty status. However, dealers are usually not obliged to call in cars for which TSBs for repairs have been issued. Nor is there a requirement to carry out the TSB repairs with no or reduced charges to the owner, since the manufacturer does not explicitly require the repair to be performed and does not reimburse the dealership for repairs. When the vehicle's manufacturer issues a recall, they require the dealership to perform the repair and will reimburse them for it.

Some benefits of an automotive TSB are that by widely circulating among dealership service departments and mechanics an engineering-level description and solution for a problem common to type, year, make or model of car, a well-managed TSB process can save technicians troubleshooting time; provide organized, itemized repair procedures; and standardize the repair process. This can also enhance the quality of the maintenance since it tends to be supported by repair history and high-level diagnostic procedure decisions.
