= Axa Investment Managers =

Global investment management firm

- Formerly: Axa Asset Management
- Type: Subsidiary
- Industry: Investment management
- Founded: 1997; 29 years ago
- Defunct: 31 December 2025
- Fate: Merged into BNP Paribas Asset Management
- Headquarters: Tour Majunga, La Défense, Puteaux, IDF, France
- Area served: Worldwide
- Products: Mutual Funds; ETFs; Quantitative funds Real Estate; Structured Finance; Hedge Funds
- Parent: Axa
- Website: axa-im.com at the Wayback Machine (archived 2017-02-23)

Axa Investment Managers (Axa IM) was an investment management company and subsidiary of Axa. It was acquired by BNP Paribas in December 2024 and the subsequently merged into BNP Paribas Asset Management on 31 December 2025.

== History ==
In 1994, Axa created an investment management subsidiary under the name, Axa Asset Management. It operated separately from the insurance business lines and was headed by Jean-Pierre Hellebuyck.

In 1997, Henri de Castries launched AXA Investment Managers (Axa IM) which Axa Asset Management became a part of. Donald Brydon was selected to be its chief executive officer.

In 1996, Dominique Senequier joined Axa and founded the Axa Private equity platform. It operated under Axa IM until 2013 where it was spun off as a separate firm and renamed Ardian.

During 1999, Axa IM paid US$125 million for a controlling stake in the Rosenberg Group, an active quantitative global equity manager based in California. It was renamed to "Rosenberg Equities" which now operates as the quantitative investment platform under Axa IM. In the same year, AXA Real Estate Investment Managers was also established. It was eventually renamed to the "Real Assets" platform.

In 2002, Axa IM set up its Structure Finance division.

In 2005, Axa IM purchased the investment firm, Framlington Group from HSBC Holdings and Comerica for US$342.5 million. It was renamed to "Framlington Equities" which now operates as a long term equity active management platform under Axa IM.

In 2006, Axa IM established a joint venture with Shanghai Pudong Development Bank. The resulting joint venture was AXA SPDB Investment Managers Co., Ltd, which is based in China.

In 2008, Axa IM set up a joint venture with Kyobo Life Insurance Company. The resulting joint venture was Kyobo AXA Investment Managers, which is based in South Korea.

In 2011, Axa Rosenberg, the firm's quantitative equity investment subsidiary, paid out a total of $242M in connection with an SEC settlement for a coding error that Axa Rosenberg concealed from its clients and that had led to investment losses. The fallout from this failure in risk management caused the collapse of Axa Rosenberg. As of 2025, Axa Rosenberg's business has been reorganized as AXA IM EQI (Axa Investment Managers Equity Quantitative Investments).

In 2012, Axa IM established two joint ventures with Bank of India. They were BOI AXA Investment Managers Private Limited and BOI AXA Trustee Services Private Limited, which are based in India.

During 2016, Axa IM set up Chorus, a hedge fund platform. In the same year, the Real Assets division acquired Sydney-based, Eureka Funds Management to expand its real assets' operation in the Asia-Pacific region.

Axa Investment registered as a crypto service provider in France in March 2023, avoiding disruption to their services. Bloomberg reported in August 2023 that Axa Investment Managers would be laying off around 90 positions out of its 2,600 employees it had as of the end of 2022.

In April 2024, Axa IM acquired W Capital Partners, a private equity firm specializing on GP-led and secondary investments.

In July 2024, it was reported that there were talks to merge Axa IM and BNP Paribas Asset Management into a joint venture between Axa and BNP Paribas which would have €1.4 trillion ($1.5 trillion) in assets under management. In December 2024, a deal was signed for $5.32 billion where Axa IM would become part of BNP Paribas.

On 1 July 2025, BNP Paribas Cardif announced that it had completed the acquisition of AXA IM, as well as reporting a partnership with AXA Group to manage part of its assets. On 31 December 2025, BNP Paribas merged Axa IM activities into BNP Paribas Asset Management, thus ending the existence of Axa IM as a standalone legal entity.
