= Arnaud Vaissié =

French businessman (born 1954)

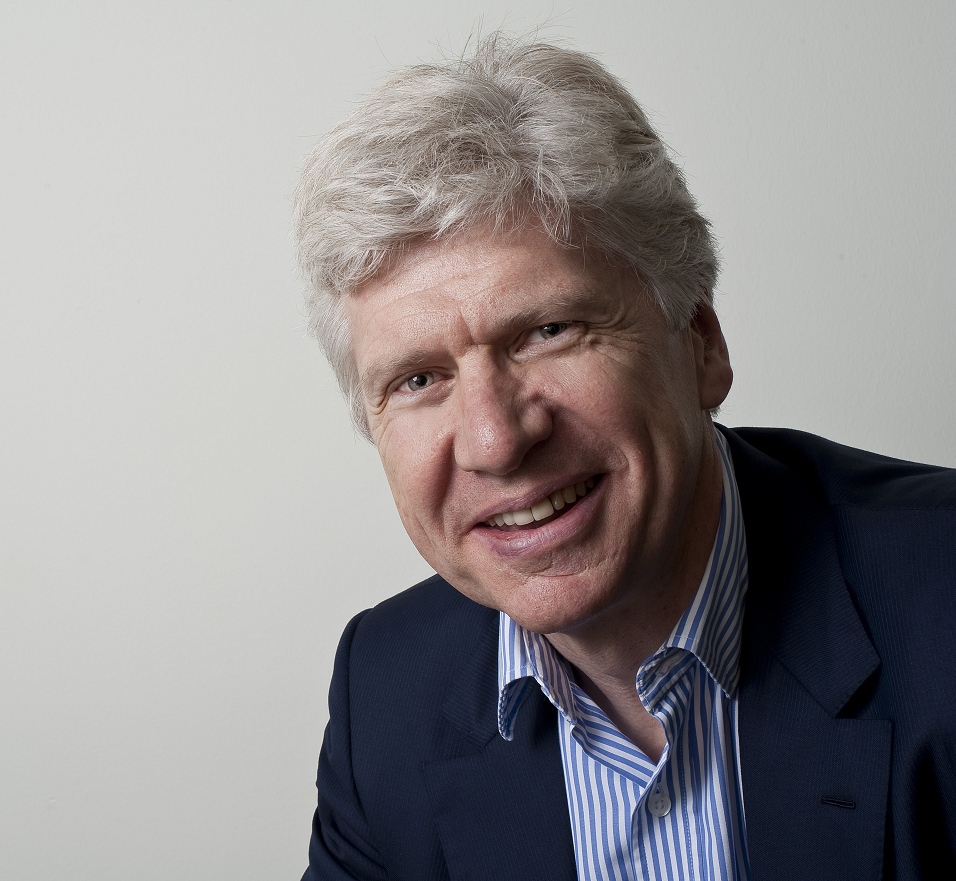
- Arnaud Vaissié in 2020
- Born: 28 November 1954 (age 71); Paris, France
- Education: Sciences Po
- Occupations: Chief Executive Officer, International SOS

Arnaud Vaissié (born 28 November 1954) is the co-founder, Chairman and CEO of medical and travel security services firm, International SOS. He is also President of CCI France International, a worldwide network of 125 French Chambers of Commerce across 95 countries.

== Early life ==
Arnaud Vaissié was born on 28 November 1954 in Paris, France. He is a graduate from Sciences-Po in Paris.

== Career ==
Arnaud Vaissié started his career in France at Clou, a company that offers financial and leasing services to the shipping and transportation industry, before moving to San Francisco to run the American subsidiary of Compass Inc.

In 1985, he co-founded International SOS in Singapore with Pascal Rey-Herme.

== Other roles ==
Arnaud Vaissié was the chairman of the French Chamber of Commerce in Great-Britain. He is the Chairman for the France-Singapore committee of MEDEF.

He is the chairman of the board of trustees of the Lycée International de Londres Winston Churchill and was a trustee in the creation of the Collège français bilingue de Londres.

He is on the board of directors of the Institut Montaigne. In 2004, he co-founded the think-tank, Le Cercle d'Outre-Manche (fr) with Pascal Boris.

== Personal life ==
Arnaud Vaissié is married and currently lives in Paris. He has three children.

== Awards ==
- Officer of the Legion of Honour (2022)
- Officer of the National Order of Merit (2012)
