= Denis Duverne =

French businessman

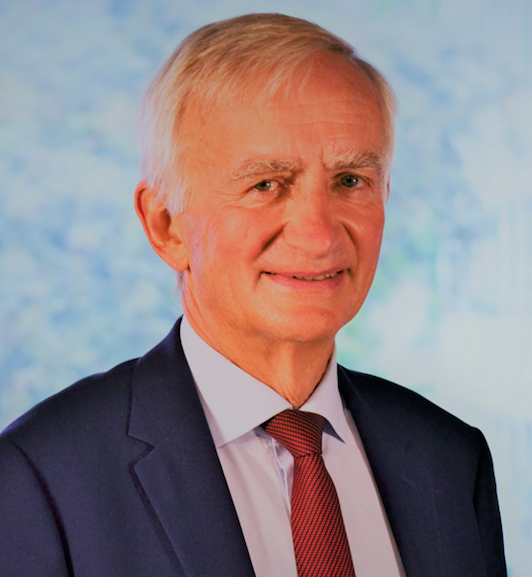
- Denis Duverne in 2019
- Born: 31 October 1953 (age 72); Lyon, France
- Education: HEC Paris; École nationale d'administration
- Occupations: Business leader, Chairman of AXA, Chairman of the Fondation pour la recherche médicale

Denis Duverne (born 31 October 1953) is a French businessman.

He has chaired the board of directors of AXA since 2016, and the supervisory board of the French Foundation for Medical Research since 2017. He is also known for his philanthropic activity.

== Career ==
=== Early life and education ===
Denis Duverne was born on 31 October 1953 in Lyon, France. He graduated from HEC Paris in 1974 and ENA in 1979 (“Michel de l’Hospital” class, 1977-1979).

=== Career before AXA ===
Duverne began his career in 1979 at the French Ministry of Finance within the national tax authority.

From 1984 to 1986, he was a commercial counselor to the Consulate General of France in New York.

In 1986, he took over the responsibility for corporate tax and then indirect taxes at the tax legislation department of the French tax authority.

In 1991, he became secretary general of IBI, a financial advisory company.

From 1992 to 1995, Duverne was a member of the executive board of Banque Colbert, in charge of operations.

=== AXA ===
Duverne joined AXA in 1995 as senior vice president finance, overseeing the group's US and UK operations. Later, he was also responsible for restructuring AXA in Belgium and the UK after AXA's merger with UAP.

He has supervised the group's financial operations since 2000.

In 2003, he was appointed member of the management board of AXA in charge of finance, control and strategy, and he held this post up to 2009. During his term, he oversaw the integration of Winterthur, an €8 billion acquisition.

In April 2010, he became member of the board of directors and deputy chief executive officer, in charge of finance, strategy and operations.

On 1 September 2016, he was named chairman of the board of directors at the same time as Thomas Buberl was named CEO, these two functions having been separated when Henri de Castries left the company. For AXA, one of the aims of appointing Duverne chairman was to build on his regulatory affairs experience in France and abroad.

His term as chairman of the board was renewed in 2018.

=== Other activities in the insurance sector ===
From 2007 to 2009, Denis Duverne was Chairman of the Europe Insurance CFO Forum, a discussion group formed by financial leaders from major insurance companies (created in 2002 to promote transparent financial reporting in the insurance sector).

Since September 2018, he has been Chair of the Insurance Development Forum, an organization launched at COP21 with the support of the World Bank and the United Nations to reinforce the use of insurance against natural disasters to protect populations and the various stakeholders involved.

Denis Duverne is also Vice President of the European Financial Services Round Table (EFR).

=== Philanthropy and public-interest work ===
In 2014, Denis Duverne joined the Private Sector Advisory Group, which was co-founded by OECD and the World Bank to improve corporate governance in developing countries.

He has been a trustee of La Chaîne d’Espoir, a charity providing access to healthcare and education for disadvantaged children, since 2014.

In 2017, he was named chairman of the supervisory board of the French Foundation for Medical Research (FRM).

In 2018 with Serge Weinberg, he launched the “Changer par le don” initiative inspired by the Giving Pledge initiated by Warren Buffett and Bill Gates. Changer par le don aims to encourage wealthy people to donate at least 10% of their revenues or property to charitable causes.

In December 2020, he was elected chairman of the Board of Saint-Jean de Passy, a school in Paris.

== Awards and distinctions ==
Knight of the Legion of Honor

Knight of the National Order of Merit

Business positions
Preceded by Henri de Castries	Chairman of Axa; 2016–present	Succeeded by Incumbent
