= Business Council for International Understanding =

Non-profit membership organisation

- Abbreviation: BCIU
- Formation: November 10, 1955; 70 years ago
- Founder: White House Industrial Cooperation Council Conference under President Dwight D. Eisenhower
- Founded at: Washington DC
- Type: Nonprofit
- Legal status: Business council
- Purpose: Provide commercial diplomacy services to the world’s governments and leading organizations
- Location: New York City, United States
- Region served: Worldwide
- Services: Organize meetings, panel discussions and off-the-record briefings between business executives and senior government officials and heads of state
- Members: 150 major companies (2024)
- Official language: English
- President and CEO: Peter Tichansky
- Funding: Members fees
- Website: bciu.org

The Business Council for International Understanding (BCIU) is an American not-for-profit, nonpartisan, membership organization that encourages dialogue between business and political leaders in different countries. It holds events, briefings and programs for networking and education. Membership comprises more than 200 companies.

== History ==
BCIU was formed November 10, 1955, at the White House Industrial Cooperation Council Conference, as an initiative directed by U.S. President Dwight D. Eisenhower. It was established with the purpose of improving foreign understanding of business practices within the United States, thereby lifting a national image that had suffered greatly through the course of the Cold War.

The organization was intended to operate as a part of a larger Eisenhower program, called People to People; however, in 1958, the umbrella initiative was shut down after failing to amass an adequate amount of independent funding. BCIU survived the initial decentralization of direction and support, and has continued to perform many of its original duties.

== Activities ==
=== Corporate to Government Event Building ===
BCIU organizes conferences and receptions for its member companies and relevant government officials to address issues of common concern. The initiative to organize a conference is taken by BCIU members, U.S. government officials, or foreign government officials. The specific format of these meetings is typically left to the discretion of the host.

=== Government contracts ===
BCIU is a pre-qualified Indefinite-Quantity Contractor (IQC) for the U.S. Trade and Development Agency (USTDA). Since 2006, BCIU has bid for opportunities to plan and manage orientation visits, conferences, and training programs in support of USTDA objectives. Once awarded a contract, BCIU is responsible for project implementation, which can include a series of meetings, site visits, roundtables, conferences, and receptions with foreign delegations. BCIU performs similar functions for the Overseas Private Investment Corporation.

=== Training ===
The organization provides commercial diplomacy training to the U.S. foreign service and other U.S. officials involved in trade promotion agencies for the sake of improved intercultural literacy. All training programs are conducted at the Foreign Service Institute.

=== Ambassador Consultations ===
BCIU organizes consultations with American businesses for outgoing ambassadors to update them on current business and commercial matters affecting their country of jurisdiction.

=== Business practica ===
BCIU organizes a program that places Foreign Service Officers into companies for two to three months to gain practical experience after having completed the Foreign Service Institute’s economic and commercial training course.

=== Past functions ===
From 1957 to 1990, BCIU operated a cross-cultural training institute with support from American University. Launched by the Eisenhower administration as the BCIU Institute, the program was designed to prepare international executives to meet the personal and professional challenges inherent to working abroad. The curriculum of the BCIU sessions included language and cultural training, as well as briefings on the current state of the U.S., its foreign policy, and its slipping image abroad. The program now runs as the Intercultural Management Institute as a part of American University’s School of International Service.

== Annual gala ==
Since 1984, BCIU has held an annual Gala in New York to celebrate partnerships within international trade and diplomacy. In 2003, BCIU introduced the Dwight D. Eisenhower Global Leadership Award, which honors a member of the business community for their leadership and achievement in the international arena; recent honorees include Sergio Marchionne, Mukesh Ambani, Marc Benioff, and Dominique Senequier.

== See also ==
- National Association of Women Business Owners
