= Thomas Buberl =

German businessman

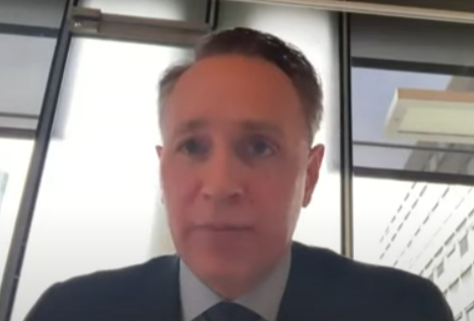
- Buberl in 2021
- Born: Cologne, West Germany (now Germany)
- Education: WHU – Otto Beisheim School of Management; Lancaster University; University of St. Gallen
- Title: CEO, Axa
- Term: 2016-
- Predecessor: Henri de Castries
- Board member of: IBM; Bertelsmann; Axa XL

Thomas Buberl is a German businessman who has been the CEO of Axa since 2016.

== Early life ==
Buberl was born in Cologne, Germany. He earned a business degree from WHU – Otto Beisheim School of Management (Germany), an MBA from Lancaster University (UK), and a PhD in economics from the University of St. Gallen (Switzerland).

== Career ==
=== Axa ===
In 2012, Buberl joined Axa as chief executive officer of AXA Konzern AG in Germany and became a member of the Axa executive committee. In March 2015, he became CEO of Axa's global health business line and a member of the Axa's management committee.

In January 2016, Buberl was also appointed CEO of the global business line, life & savings. From March to August 2016, he was deputy CEO of Axa Group.

Buberl became CEO and a member of the board of directors in September 2016, when Denis Duverne was made chairman (the two roles were separated when Henri de Castries left the company on this date). Under his leadership, Axa bought XL, for 12.4 billion in 2018 as part of a shift towards casualty and property insurance.

In 2019, Buberl became one of the founding members of the Climate Finance Leadership Initiative (CFLI), a group convened by Michael R. Bloomberg to help facilitate the private financing objectives included in the Paris Agreement.

== Recognition ==
In 2008, Buberl was named a "Young Global Leader" by the World Economic Forum.

In July 14, 2019, he was promoted to the rank of Knight of the Legion of Honor in France.

Business positions
Preceded by Henri de Castries	CEO of Axa; 2016-	Succeeded by Currently
