= Institut Montaigne =

French think tank

Institut Montaigne is a think tank based in Paris, France, founded in 2000. Institut Montaigne makes public policy recommendations to advance its agenda, which broadly reflects that of the large French companies that fund it. It contracts experts from the French business community, academia, civil society, and government.

== Research ==
Institut Montaigne focuses on four main policy fields:

- Social cohesion: education, higher education, employment, and lifelong learning.
- Public policy: pension, justice, healthcare, environment, and European issues.
- Competitiveness: firms, energy, transports, SMB, digital economy, and financial market regulation.
- Public finances: taxation, local finances, public spending, and local authorities.

Institut Montaigne is also involved in promoting innovative democratic platforms. In 2011, the think tank led an ambitious research program under the supervision of Gilles Kepel on the suburban cities of Clichy-sous-Bois and Montfermeil where the 2005 riots sparked. The findings were published in the book Banlieue de la République. This work was later completed by “Passion française”, a political essay based on a series of interviews conducted in the cities of Roubaix and Marseille to meet candidates of foreign origin who ran for the 2012 legislative elections.

Institut Montaigne feeds the public debate by providing data and assessment tools. During the 2012 presidential campaign, Institut Montaigne forecasted the budgetary impact of the main candidates’ programs. A similar initiative was undertaken during the 2014 municipal campaign in France's 10 largest cities, as well as for the 2015 regional campaign. During the 2017 presidential campaign, on top of quantitative analyses, it evaluated over 120 electoral program promises and proposals.

Institut Montaigne also developed a game dedicated to public finances, allowing players to understand how budgetary and macroeconomic policies impact the French public deficit and the national debt.

Institut Montaigne organizes political forums to which citizens are invited to draft new policies. For instance, in 2012, it held a citizen's conference on the French healthcare system. A representative panel of 25 participants was informed of the functions of the healthcare system and its challenges. After a series of workshops, the panel released a report in which it stated its main policy proposals.

== Activities ==
Institut Montaigne expresses concrete policy proposals to enhance both competitiveness and social cohesion. The ideas are conveyed through four types of publications:

- Reports, which is the work produced by dedicated taskforces
- Studies, produced by one or a group of experts
- Policy briefs, which react to current policy issues
- Books and collective works, which provide an in-depth analysis of a specific issue.

Recent publications (in English)

- A New Strategy for France in a New Arab World (August 2017)
- Syria: to End a Never-Ending War (June 2017)
- What Role for Cars in Tomorrow’s World? (June 2017)
- The Europe We Need (March 2017)
- The Circular Economy: Reconciling Economic Growth with the Environment (November 2016)
- A French Islam Is Possible (September 2016)
- Rebuilding France’s National Security (September 2016)
- Religious Discrimination in Access to Employment: a Reality (October 2015)
- Big Data and the Internet of Things: Making France a Leader in the Digital Revolution (April 2015)

== Controversies ==
=== Actions during the 2012 presidential campaign ===
In April 2012 the Montaigne Institute was criticized for effectively advertising for Nicolas Sarkozy, at a time in the campaign when advertising by political parties counted against the candidates budget limit. Indeed, a March to April advertising campaign by the Montaigne institute put forward a proposal which closely matched some remarks made by the president-candidate, Nicolas Sarkozy, leading to an investigation by the French media regulator (CSA).
This proposal had already been formulated by the Montaigne Institute in 2006 in a study by Jacques Bichot.
Other proposals put forward during this campaign echo François Hollande's programs, such as those on priority in primary school, defended by the Montaigne Institute in its report Vaincre Failure in Primary School in 2010.

Following the intervention of the CSA, BFMTV, BFM Radio or even RMC cease broadcasting for the duration of the campaign of the spots of the Institut Montaigne in favor of Nicolas Sarkozy's proposals. The Montaigne Institute also quantified the measures proposed by the candidates for the presidential election, in partnership with the newspaper Les Échos.
The quality of this work has been disputed; for Médiapart "the ideological presuppositions, the absence of a guarantee on the impartiality of the calculations or the secret kept on the identity of the" encryptors "cast suspicion on this project".

During the campaign, La Chaîne européenne (LCP) had Laurent Bigorgne, then director of the Montaigne Institute, as editorial writer for his political program Thèmes de campagne. This program, presented by Patrick Poivre d'Arvor, received, from March to June 2012, Pascal Lamy, Nicole Notat, Thierry Breton and Jacques Attali.

=== Actions during the 2017 presidential campaign ===
The president of the institute, Laurent Bigorgne, contributed to Emmanuel Macron's campaign from April 2016 onwards. The analysis of the candidates' economic programs by the Montaigne Institute and the Les Échos newspaper supported that of Emmanuel Macron and severely criticized left wing candidates Jean-Luc Mélenchon and Benoit Hamon.

The institute has subsequently been close to Macrons's government. Prime Minister Édouard Philippe attended in November 2018 the lunch between member companies and political figures that the think tank organizes. Laurent Bigorgne was appointed in June 2018 to the Public Action Committee 2022, installed by the prime minister to design the state reform project, then was invited to debate with Emmanuel Macron on March 22, 2019, with sixty-five other intellectuals, to deal with the yellow vests crisis. Gilles Babinet, the institute's referent on the digital issue, was appointed by the government as vice-president of the National Digital Council in May 2018.

=== Financial regulation and public or private corruption ===
The institute details its work and firm positions in terms of financial regulation and against bribery on the French version of this entry.
The presence on the steering committee of Marwan Lahoud, a former Airbus executive cited by numerous publications as being at the center of a commission system, in the large-scale corruption scandal concerning Airbus. (Note: He is cited by many publications as being at the center of a system of illegal commissions. In Great Britain, the Financial Times published on January 31, 2020, in an article titled "Airbus ran 'massive' bribery 'schemes to win orders", a photo of him with the caption: "Marwan Lahoud, who ran the organization of strategy and marketing of Airbus, SMO, a division dedicated to securing sales in emerging markets and at the heart of a catalog of offenses". In Germany, the Handelsblatt wrote a long article on September 10, 2017 on these corruption cases, and in particular noted: "Although the case of Kazakhstan is serious enough, there could be worse to come as investigators turn to contracts civil aviation with China and Turkey. In the latter case, Mr. Lahoud is said to have signed $250 million in bribes. Airbus denies allegations, but some say Mr. Lahoud's sudden departure from the company last February now appears in a new light.") (Note: In January 2020, the press announced that the French, British and American courts had validated the agreements made earlier in the week by Airbus and the French National Financial Prosecutor's Office (PNF), the British Serious Fraud Office (SFO) and the United States Department of Justice (DoJ), under which the European group Airbus recognizes corrupt practices in around twenty specific files, and undertakes to pay fines totaling 3.6 billion euros: 2.08 billion in France under a judicial agreement of public interest (CJIP), 984 million in the United Kingdom and 526 million in the United States.) also raises the question of the Institut Montaigne's report on these questions.

=== Sexual harassment ===
The long-time director of the institute, Laurent Bigorgne, was accused in February 2022 of drugging a younger staff member whom he was sexually pursuing with MDMA. Bigorgne subsequently resigned.

== Organisation ==
=== Board of directors ===
- Henri de Castries, president, Institut Montaigne
- David Azéma, Vice President of Institut Montaigne, partner at Perella Weinberg Partners
- Emmanuelle Barbara, managing partner, August Debouzy
- Marguerite Bérard, head of BNP Paribas French Retail Banking
- Jean-Pierre Clamadieu, chairman of the board of directors, Engie
- Marwan Lahoud, chairman of ACE Capital Partners
- Fleur Pellerin, former Minister, founder and CEO, Korelya Capital
- Natalie Rastoin, senior advisor of WPP
- René Ricol, partner/co-founder, Ricol Lasteyrie Corporate Finance
- Jean-Dominique Senard, vice president of Institut Montaigne, chairman of the board of directors, Renault
- Arnaud Vaissié, co-founder and CEO, International SOS
- Natacha Valla, economist and dean of science Po's School of Management and Innovation
- Florence Verzelen, executive vice president, Dassault Systèmes
- Philippe Wahl, CEO, La Poste Groupe

=== Experts ===
Institut Montaigne brings together a number of experts who provide research, policy recommendations, and analyses on a full range of public policy issues, in particular on our blogs.

- Gilles Babinet, advisor on digital issues
- Nicolas Bauquet, contributor on public transformation issues
- Nicolas Baverez, contributor on defense issues
- Dalila Berritane, contributor on African issues
- Patrick Calvar, special advisor on security and defense issues
- Eric Chaney, economic advisor
- Mathieu Duchâtel, contributor on Asian issues
- Michel Duclos, special advisor for geopolitics
- Hakim El Karoui, senior fellow
- Benjamin Fremaux, senior fellow – energy and climate
- François Godement, senior advisor for Asia
- Christophe Jaffrelot, contributor in Indian issues
- Marc Lazar, contributor on French and European political and institutional issues
- Théophile Lenoir, contributor on digital issues
- Angèle Malâtre-Lansac, contributor on health issues
- Cécile Maisonneuve, senior fellow – cities, territories, sustainable development
- Bertrand Martinot, senior fellow – apprenticeship, employment, professional training
- Laure Millet, contributor on health issues
- Dominique Moïsi, special advisor for geopolitics
- Franck Morel, senior fellow – labor, employment, social dialogue
- Soli Özel, senior fellow – international relations
- Alexandre Robinet-Borgomano, contributor on Germany
- Bruno Tertrais, senior fellow – strategic affairs
- Jean-Paul Tran Thiet, senior fellow
- Francis Vérillaud, special advisor
- Georgina Wright, contributor on European issues

=== Permanent staff ===
Laurent Bigorgne has been the managing director of Institut Montaigne since 2011. Thirty-five permanent members of staff work there.

== Budget and financial resources ==
Institut Montaigne is a non-profit organization, depending on the French law of 1901. In 2020, Institut Montaigne's annual budget amounted to 6.6 million euros. More than 190 companies, of all sizes and all industries, contribute every year to its operation, each one of them representing less than 2% of the total budget. About 300 legal persons also support Institut Montaigne's procedure. Their total support represents 1% of the operating budget of Institut Montaigne.

Members (the list is current as of 12 August 2022):

- ABB France, Accuracy, ADIT, Aegis Média France, Air France-KLM, Airbus, Allen & Overy, Allianz, Alvarez & Marsal France, ArchiMed, Ardian, AT Kearney, August Debouzy avocats, AXA, Archery Strategy Consulting,
- Baker & McKenzie, Bank of America Merrill Lynch, BNI France and Belgium, BearingPoint, BNP Paribas, Bolloré, Boston Consulting Group, Bouygues, Groupe BPCE, Bred Banque Populaire, Brunswick,
- d’Angelin & Co, Caisse des dépôts et consignations, Capgemini, Carbonnier Lamaze & Rasle & Associés, Careit, Carrefour, Groupe Casino, CGI France, Chaîne Thermale du Soleil, CIS, Cisco Systems France, CNP Assurances, Cohen Amir-Aslani, Conseil Supérieur du Notariat, Crédit Agricole, Crédit foncier de France, Davis Polk & Wardwell
- De Pardieu Brocas Maffei, Dentsu Aegis Network, Development institute international,
- EDF, Elsan, Engie, Equancy, Électricité de France, Eurazeo, Eurostar,
- Foncière INEA
- Gaillard Partners, Gras Savoye, Groupama, Groupe Edmond de Rothschild, Groupe M6, Groupe Orange,
- Groupe Randstad France,
- Henner, HSBC France,
- IBM France, IFPASS, ING Bank France, INSEEC, International SOS, Ionis Education Group, ISRP
- Jalma, Jeant et Associés,
- Kantar, KPMG,
- La Banque Postale, La Parisienne Assurances, Laboratoires Servier, Lazard, Linedata Services, LIR, LivaNova, LVMH
- MACSF, Malakoff Médéric, Mazars, McKinsey & Company, Média-Participations, Mercer, Meridiam, Michelin, Microsoft France,
- Nestlé France,
- Obea, Ondra Partners,
- PAI Partners, Pierre & Vacances, Plastic Omnium
- Radiall, Raise, Ramsay Générale de Santé RATP Group, Randstad, REDEX, Renault, Rexel, Ricol, Lasteyrie et Associés, Robertson Simon, Roche, Roland Berger, Rothschild & Cie Banque,
- Sanofi, Santéclair, Schneider Electric, SGS, Servier, Siaci Saint Honoré, Sia Partners, Sier Constructeur, SNCF, SNCF reseau, Sodexo, Solvay, Stallergenes, Suez Environnement,
- Tecnet Participations, The Boston Consulting Group, TIGF, Tilder, Total S.A.
- UBS France,
- Veolia Environnement, Vinci, Vivendi, Voyageurs du monde,
