= Laurent Bigorgne =

French essayist (born 1974)

- Born: October 20, 1974 (age 51); Épinal, Vosges, France
- Education: Nancy 2 University; Sciences Po
- Occupations: Essayist, public policy researcher, think tank director

Laurent Bigorgne (born 20 October 1974) is a French essayist. He was the Director of the Institut Montaigne from 2010 until 27 February 2022.

== Early life and education ==
Laurent Bigorgne is the son of two secondary school teachers. His father was head teacher at the lycée professionnel of Pompey and his mother was an IT teacher. He was born on 20 October 1974 in Épinal, a commune in the Vosges, a department of the Grand Est region of France. He was brought up in Meurthe-et-Moselle.

He studied at the Centre for Political Studies and at the History Department of the Nancy 2 University between 1992 and 1994. He then proceeded to complete a degree in communication and human resources at Sciences Po, a prestigious social sciences French university, graduating in 1996. During his studies, he was an active member of the Union Nationale des Étudiants de France students union.

He began writing a thesis on the parliamentary history of the French Third Republic, which he did not complete.

== Career ==
During the late-1990s, Bigorgne briefly was a high school teacher in Nancy. In 2000, he was appointed Director of the Nancy Campus of Sciences Po by Richard Descoings The campus was the first of Sciences Po's regional campuses, and was specialised in European integration and the Franco-German relationship. In 2004, he was appointed Director of Studies at Sciences Po, and later, in 2007, Deputy Director of the institution. In 2008 and 2009, he was a visiting professor at the London School of Economics.

In 2009, Bigorgne was appointed Director of Studies at the Institut Montaigne by Claude Bébéar. Following the departure of the Institute's director in November 2010, he took the helm of the organisation.

He is reportedly a close friend of French President Emmanuel Macron. In the 2017 French presidential election, Bigorgne declared his support for Macron, and joined his campaign team, advising him on education policy. He also appeared in the 2017 Macron e-mail leaks. Although he was cited as a potential minister, he was never called to join the French Government.

He participated in the 2015 Bilderberg meeting.

In June 2018, French Prime Minister Édouard Philippe invited Bigorgne to join the advisory council on state reforms.

== Other activities ==
- Trilateral Commission, Member of the European Group

== Legal issues ==
On 25 February 2022, Laurent Bigorgne was placed into police custody following a complaint from one of his assistants at the Institut Montaigne, who also happens to be the sister of his ex-wife. She accused him of stealthily drugging her with MDMA during a work meeting organised at his home in the evening of 22 February. The complainant reported that Bigorgne had consumed cocaine during that meeting, and she also stated that he had made a habit of sending her sexual messages. During police custody, he admitted the facts of which he was accused but denied any sexual motive in his act. On 27 February, he resigned his position as Director of the Institut Montaigne. His lawyers Sébastien Schapira and Jean Veil, the latter of whom also was the defender of Olivier Duhamel in the Duhamel scandal (another judicial case linked to Sciences Po) stated that the investigation, which is closed, confirms Laurent Bigorgne's explanations. He nonetheless received a 12 months suspended sentence, with the court explicitly quoting sexual motives.

== Publications ==
- With Alice Baudry and Olivier Duhamel, Macron, et en même temps… (Plon, 2017) ISBN 978-2259259866
- With Olivier Duhamel, Les mots du coronavirus (Dalloz, 2020)
