= Pollution insurance =

Pollution insurance is a type of insurance that covers costs related to pollution. This can include the costs of brownfield restoration and cleanup, liability for injuries and deaths caused by pollution. Most businesses will purchase broad commercial general insurance or property insurance policies but these usually contain an "absolute pollution exclusion" and thus rarely cover pollution, although there may be limited pollution coverage.

Pollution insurance usually takes the form of first-party coverage for contamination of insured property either by external or on-site sources. Coverage is also afforded for liability to third parties arising from contamination of air, water, or land due to the sudden and accidental release of hazardous materials from the insured site. The policy usually covers the costs of cleanup and may include coverage for releases from underground storage tanks. Intentional acts are specifically excluded.

The largest players in this industry are AIG, XL, Ace and Zurich. One of the purposes for such insurance policies is so that when companies that cause environmental disasters go bankrupt, the victims can still be compensated. The insurance may also protect against cost overruns or regulatory changes that increase the cost of cleanup. The director of China's EPA (SEPA) has called for imposing mandatory pollution insurance on polluting industries.

According to the Cato Institute, legal theories of joint and several liability (e.g. under Superfund) and requirements by courts that insurers pay to help polluters clean up their own property (regardless of the insurance contract) have hurt the pollution insurance industry; but nonetheless, the basic idea of pollution insurance remains sound. Cato claims, "With the help of insurers and risk analysts, corporate risk managers select cost-effective products and processes, which minimize the sum of insurance premiums, expected payments to victims (in excess of insurance coverage), and risk-reduction expenditures."

== United States ==
In the United States, the federal U.S. Comprehensive Environmental Response, Compensation & Liability Act of 1980 (CERCLA), also known as Superfund, is the predominant law.

However, there are also important state laws with similar or additional requirements. In 2013, the State of Oregon passed Oregon Environmental Cleanup Assistance Act which significantly increased the responsibility of insurers to cover pollution.

== See also ==
- Environmental economics
- List of environmental issues
