= Fondation pour la recherche médicale =

French foundation

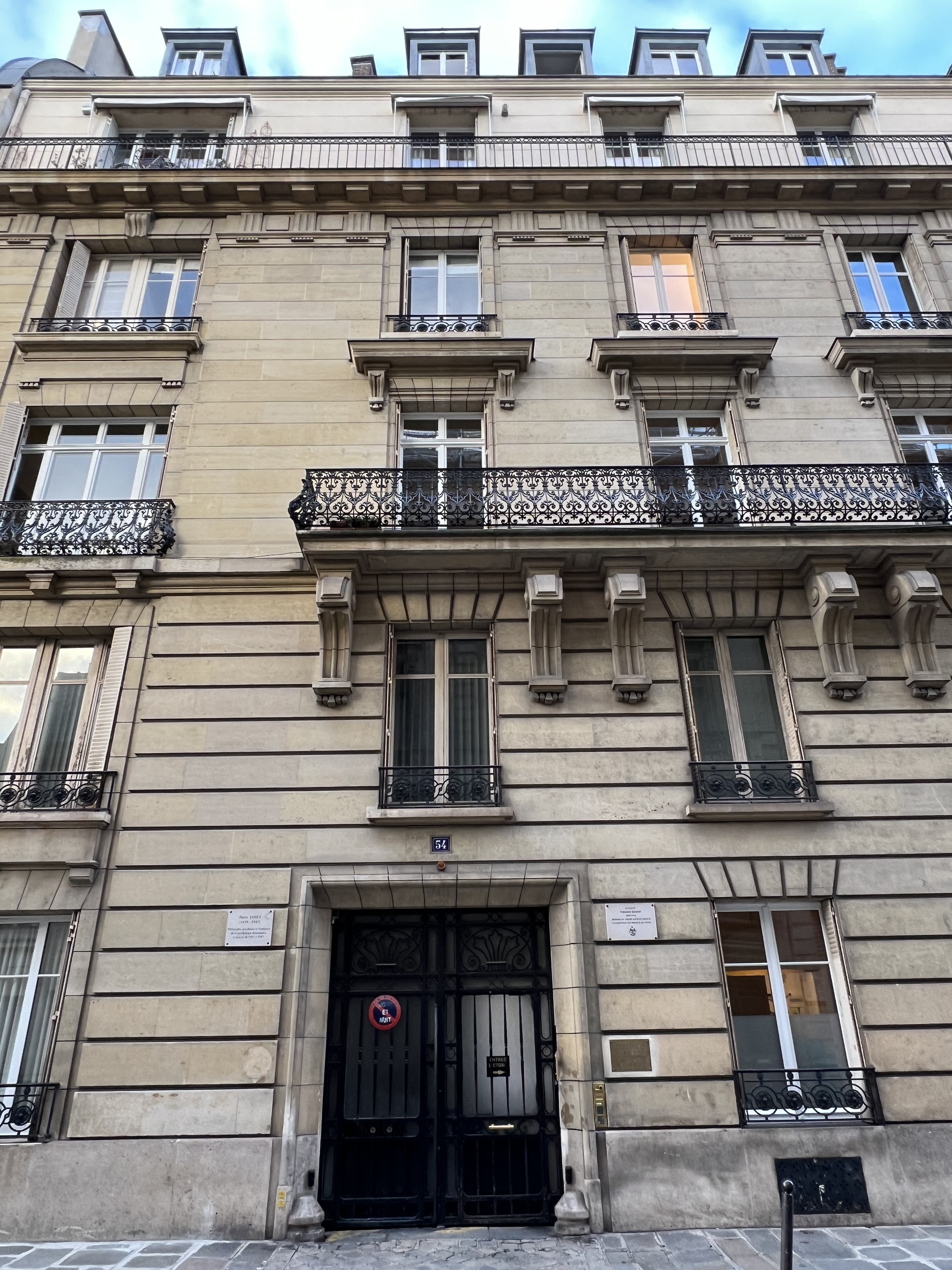
- Motto: Innover pour sauver
- Established: 1947
- Mission: Fundamental research
- Focus: Medicine
- President: Denis Duverne
- Location: Paris, France
- Coordinates: 48.8545975°N 2.3216188°E
- Interactive map of Fondation pour la recherche médicale
- Website: https://www.frm.org
- Position in France

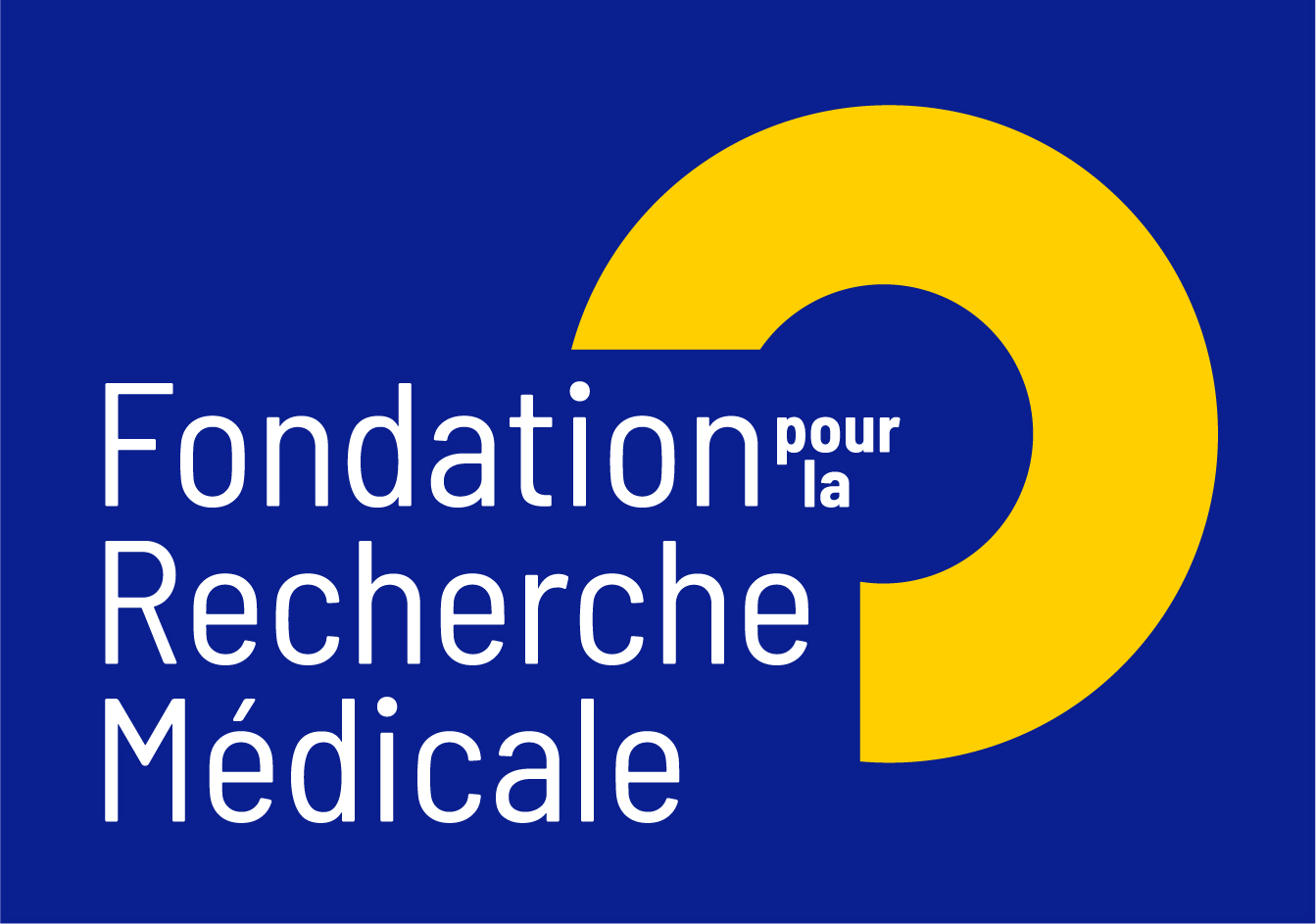
Logo

The Fondation pour la recherche médicale or FRM, is a French foundation created in 1947 among others by professors Jean Bernard and Jean Hamburger, on a private management basis but recognized as being of public utility in 1965. Its mission is to support and finance public research in all areas in the fields of medicine and pathophysiology.

The FRM's funding is based solely on the donations and legacies it receives. To promote its action to the public and enable them to call on donations with confidence, the foundation joins the Charter committee.

== History ==
Since its creation in 1947, the Association for Medical Research has not limited itself to funding research on a particular pathology but on all diseases: Alzheimer's disease, cancers, heart attacks, leukemia, diabetes, multiple sclerosis, Parkinson's disease, diseases of aging, infectious diseases, orphan diseases. The association acquired foundation status in 1962 following an appeal for private aid signed by 132 researchers and doctors. It was recognized as being of public utility on May 14, 1965.

== Medical discoveries ==
The FRM has financially supported several research programs which have led to certain advances in the medical field:

- 1983: Identification of a key gene in the regulation of blood pressure;
- 1990 – 1991: Identification of the genetic anomaly responsible for acute promyelocytic leukemia;
- 2000: Evidence of the effectiveness of deep brain stimulation in the treatment of severe forms of Parkinson's disease;
- 2014: Use of stem cells in improving cardiac functions after myocardial infarction.

== Sponsors ==
Since the 1990s, part of the communication and the call for donations has been done thanks to the media action of the foundation's sponsors, including Thierry Lhermitte, Clotilde Courau, Marina Carrère d'Encausse, Nagui, and Marc Lévy.

Every year, in September, it leads a major national mobilization campaign against Alzheimer's disease for which several ambassadors get involved and call for donations, notably M Pokora, Laury Thilleman, Élie Semoun and Tom Villa.

== Resources ==
The FRM finances its actions thanks to funds paid by its donors, testators and partners. It does not receive state funds. It benefits from the “Don entrust” label, issued by the Charter Committee.

FRM expenditure is controlled by an independent auditor. This control results in an annual publication of the certified accounts. All of the association's activity reports are made public and accessible on the Foundation's website.

Each donor can request that their donation be directed towards a specific area of research.

== Structure ==
The FRM supervisory board is chaired voluntarily by Denis Duverne who succeeded Jacques Bouriez in 2017. It defines strategic choices in terms of research funding thanks to a board appointed by the supervisory board, which is made up of three members (director of scientific affairs, director of development and communication and administrative and financial director). The FRM employs 42 employees for its operations, but all of its bodies are voluntary.

The Scientific Council examines the funding requests sent to it through the various calls for projects. Its opinion is then transmitted to the management board before being approved. The Scientific Council is made up of 32 members, all carrying out research activity within a public or mixed establishment.

=== Presidency ===
- 1983-2010 : Pierre Joly
- 2010-2017 : Jacques Bouriez
- Since September 2017 : Denis Duverne

== Financial data ==
The Foundation for Medical Research has dedicated 47 million euros to medical research in 2022, enabling the financing of more than 400 research projects.
