= Ardian (company) =

French private equity firm

Ardian Holding SAS

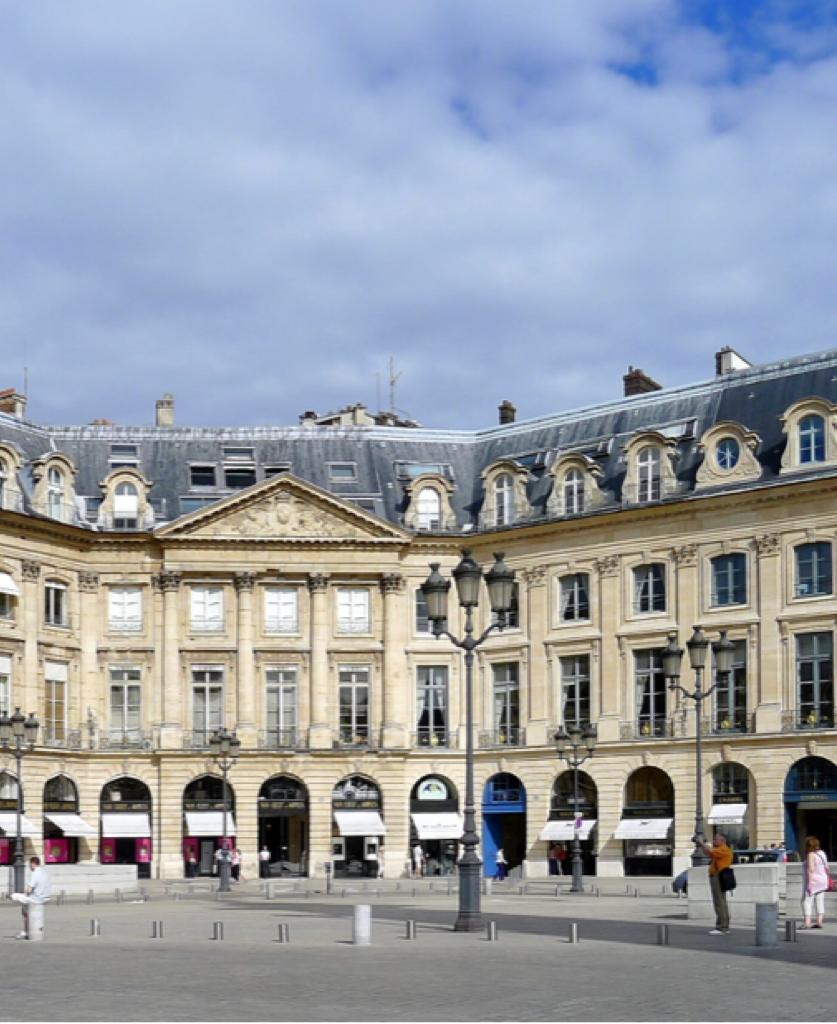
- Headquarters at 20 Place Vendôme
- Type: Private
- Industry: Private equity
- Predecessor: Axa Private Equity
- Founded: 1996; 30 years ago
- Founder: Dominique Senequier
- Headquarters: Paris, France
- Area served: Europe, North America, Asia
- Products: Funds of funds, direct funds, private debt and infrastructure, real estate, mandates
- Total assets: US$180 billion (2025)
- Number of employees: 1000+
- Website: ardian.com

Ardian is a French private equity investment firm with more than $200 billion of assets. The company is based in France, founded and managed by Dominique Senequier. It is one of the largest European-headquartered private equity funds.

Ardian's assets under management are located in Europe, North America and Asia; the firm has sixteen offices globally, in Paris, London, Frankfurt, Milan, Madrid, Zurich, New York, San Francisco, Beijing, Singapore, Tokyo, Jersey, Luxembourg, Santiago, Abu Dhabi and Seoul. The firm offers a funds of funds, direct funds, infrastructure, private debt and real estate, and manages a direct portfolio of more than 150 companies. Its fund of funds segments owns stakes in over 1500 funds. Ardian's 880 investors include institutional investors, funds of funds, government agencies, sovereign funds, family offices, pension funds and insurance companies). The firm has been ranked one of the largest companies by amount raised in equity by Private Equity International (PEI), and in June 2024, Ardian ranked 44th in PEI's 300 ranking among the world's largest private equity firms.

== History ==
The company was originally set up by Dominique Senequier in 1996 as part of Axa Investment Managers, the investment arm of Axa. Senequier was one of the first seven women admitted to the French Ecole Polytechnique in France in 1972.

Originally part of Axa Investment Managers, the investment arm of Axa, the company operated under the name AXA Private Equity until 2013, when the firm achieved independent status and was renamed to Ardian.

In 1996, Claude Bébéar, founder and former Axa CEO, tasked Dominique Senequier with the creation of a private equity entity at Axa. Based in Paris, Axa Private Equity started off with ten clients and €100 million worth of assets. The first investment took place in 1998 in the GSI Banque company Linedata.

In 1999, the company opened offices in London and New York. That same year, it launched its funds of funds investment strategy.

In 2001, it entered the German market by opening an office in Frankfurt.

In 2005, it opened an office in Singapore and entered the Asian market.

In 2008, Dominique Senequier insisted on distributing a higher percentage of the company's capital gains to the employees of the companies in Ardian's portfolio.

In 2009, Ardian acquired 100% of Kallista, a French company specialized in the production of renewable energies. Ardian then invested heavily in transports, energy, water supply and waste management. €2.5 billion were invested in infrastructure systems between 2005 and 2014.

In 2010, during the increased activity in the private equity secondary market, it acquired a US$1.9 billion private equity portfolio from Bank of America and a US$900 million portfolio from Natixis.

When Axa Private Equity was put up for sale in 2011, Senequier led a management buyout to acquire it from the parent company Axa. Axa retained a 23% stake, while Senequier, Gombault, Gaillard and the French luxury group Hermès all bought stakes of about 10 percent. The business was renamed Ardian (ar・di・an), from the old world hardjan, meaning durability and strength.

In 2012, the company opened an office in Beijing to invest in the Chinese market.

In 2013, Axa Private Equity announced that it had completed its spin-off from the Axa Group and finished the renaiming of the firm to Ardian. Per the terms of the deal, Axa Group retained ownership of 23% of the firm, management and employees owned 46%, and the remaining 31% was held by French family offices and institutions. In 2013, 85% of employees were shareholders. In 2013, Private Equity International ranked Ardian in the largest private equity firms by PE capital raised and named it Company of the Year 2013 in France.

In 2015, the firm opened an office in Madrid, Spain. On 7 September 2015, it announced the launch of Ardian Real Estate, dedicated to investment in non-residential properties in Europe. On 7 October 2015, it opened an office in San Francisco, USA, In 2016, Ardian celebrated the company's 20th anniversary with a major expansion plan, targeting North America for their next phase of growth. In the following three years, they launched North American Buyout and Infrastructure funds, expanded in Asia with offices in Tokyo and Seoul, and opened their first South American office in Santiago.

In 2017, Ardian opened an office in Tokyo, Japan.

In 2020, Ardian bought PRGX as founding investor, Gombault, left the company.

In April 2021, Ardian raised €7.5 billion for LBO acquisitions in Europe and the United States. In October of the same year, Ardian, along with the FiveT Hydrogen platform, announced the launch of the Hy24 investment fund.

In 2022 Ardian bought Míla, Iceland’s largest telecom infrastructure company.

In 2023, Ardian opened office in Abu Dhabi, UAE, marking the 16th country with an office worldwide. In 2023, Ardian's 1,050 staff were responsible for $150bn of assets, including the acquisition of a 15% stake in Heathrow Airport Holdings from Ferrovial.

In March 2024, it was announced Ardian had completed the acquisition of Digital 9 Infrastructure's entire stake in the UK-based data centre platform, Verne Global, in a deal worth up to £450 million.

On 15 December 2024, it was reported that Ardian and Public Investment Fund of Saudi Arabia have successfully acquired 22.6% and 15% respectively of stakes in Heathrow Airport for a combined US$4.12 billion from Ferrovial and some shareholders in FGP TopCo.

In October 2025, Ardian acquired Irish energy company Energia Group in a deal estimated at more than €2.5 billion.

== Investment activities ==
The company operates on five business segments:

- Funds of funds, which manages approximately $69 billion of assets focusing on primary, early secondary and secondary Funds of Funds.
- Direct funds, which manages approximately $28 billion.
- Infrastructure, which manages approximately $21 billion.
- Private debt, which manages approximately $10 billion.
- Real estate, launched September 2015, manages approximately $2 billion.

== Shareholding ==
Ardian employees represent a majority shareholding (about 70 %).

== See also ==
- Frulact
