= Henri de Castries =

French businessman (born 1954)

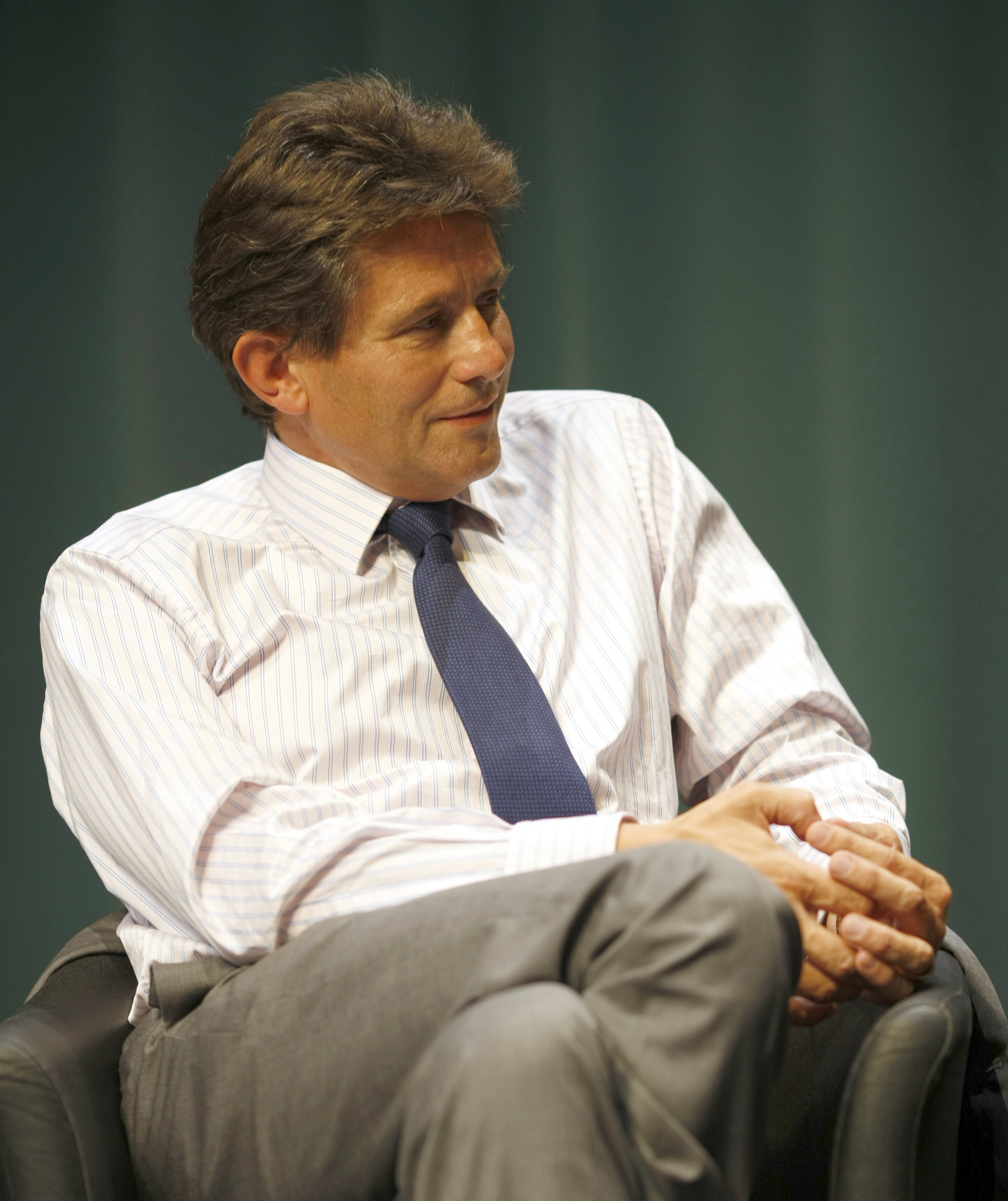
- De Castries in 2009
- Born: Henri de La Croix de Castries; 15 August 1954 (age 72); Bayonne, France
- Education: Lycée Saint-Jean de Passy; Collège Stanislas de Paris; HEC Paris; ÉNA
- Occupation: Executive
- Spouse: Married
- Children: 3

Henri de La Croix de Castries (French pronunciation: [ɑ̃ʁi d(ə) kastʁi]; born 15 August 1954) is a French businessman. He was chairman and CEO of AXA from 2000 to 2016. He has been chairman of the Bilderberg Group steering committee since 2012.

Since 2015, he has been chairman of French think tank Institut Montaigne, based in Paris.

== Early life ==
Henri de La Croix de Castries was born on August 15, 1954, in Bayonne. His father was Count François de La Croix de Castries (1919/20–2011) who had a military career in Korea, Indochina, and Algeria. His maternal grandfather, Count Pierre de Chevigné, was a colonel in the Free French forces during the Second World War.

With the backing of his family, De Castries broke with custom by not choosing a military career, although he did perform his national service in a parachute regiment, where he developed a passion for freefall.

De Castries attended the private Catholic school Saint-Jean de Passy, followed by high school at the Catholic Collège Stanislas de Paris He graduated from HEC Paris in 1976, the same year as Serge Lepeltier and Denis Kessler, from the École nationale d'administration (ENA) alongside Dominique de Villepin, François Hollande and Ségolène Royal in 1980 (Promotion Voltaire).

He also holds a law degree and speaks fluent English and German.

== Career ==
From 1980 to 1984, De Castries performed audit assignments on behalf of the Minister of Finances of France, and in 1984 he became a member of the management of the French Treasury. In 1986, he participated in the privatisation initiated by Jacques Chirac's government, including Compagnie Générale d'Electricité, now known as Alcatel-Lucent, and TF1, both on the CAC 40.

De Castries started his career at AXA in 1989, when he joined the central financial direction. In 1991, he was appointed general secretary, in charge of restructurations and mergers (integration of Compagnie du Midi). He was appointed general director in 1993, in charge of North America and UK in 1994, and in charge of the merger and integration with Union des assurances de Paris (UAP) in 1996. He served as President of the Board of Equitable (which became AXA Financial) in 1997, and has been Chairman of the Board of Directors since 2000. In 2009, he took full charge at AXA by consolidating the role of chairman with his chief executive position.

Late in De Castries' tenure, AXA became the first global financial institution to shun investments in coal companies when it sold 500 million euros of coal assets in 2015. In 2016, he decided that AXA would join a global movement to exit tobacco investments by unloading about $2 billion in cigarette company stocks and bonds.

In March 2016, it was announced De Castries would retire from both chairman and CEO roles at AXA on 1 September.

By late 2016, De Castries was regarded as frontrunner for taking over as chairman of HSBC; instead, the position went to Mark Tucker. Following the primaries for the 2017 presidential election, he served as François Fillon’s senior adviser and was tipped by news media for a future role as finance minister.

In 2017, De Castries joined General Atlantic, the majority shareholder of Argus Media, as chairman and senior advisor.

== Other activities ==
=== Corporate boards ===
- LVMH, Member of the Board of Directors (since 2024)
- Stellantis, Member of the Board of Directors (since 2021)
- Argus Media, Member of the Board of Directors (since 2018)
- HSBC, Independent non-executive member of the Board of Directors (since 2016)
- LeapFrog Investments, Member of the Global Advisory Council
- Nestlé, Independent Member of the Board of Directors (2012–2024)

=== Non-profit organizations ===
- Carnegie Endowment for International Peace, Member of the Board of Trustees (since 2019)
- German Council on Foreign Relations (DGAP), Member of the Presidium (since 2019)
- Institut Montaigne, President (since 2015)
- Bilderberg Group, Chairman of the Steering Committee (2010-2019)
- American Friends of the Louvre, Member of the Advisory Board
- Fondation Nationale des Sciences Politiques (FNSP), Member of the Board
- Institut du Bosphore, Honorary President of the Scientific Committee
- Museum Berggruen (Berlin), Member of the International Council
- Paris School of International Affairs (PSIA), Member of the Strategic Committee
- Re-Imagine Europa, Member of the Advisory Board
- Association pour l'Aide aux Jeunes Infirmes, Member of the Board of Directors
- AXA Atout Cœur, President
- Geneva Association, President (2003-2008)

== Political positions ==
In a joint contribution published in French newspaper Le Monde in June 2012, De Castries – alongside fellow CEOs Franco Bernabè of Telecom Italia and Peter Löscher of Siemens – made a plea for European Union leaders to boost integration and restore growth in light of the European debt crisis.

== Personal life ==
De Castries lives on the Boulevard Saint-Germain in Paris, and his brother-in-law lives in the same building. He spends his weekends in a castle in Anjou, and one week a month in the United States. He is married and has three children.

Business positions
Preceded by Claude Bébéar	CEO of AXA; 2000–2016	Succeeded by Thomas Buberl
