= Serge Weinberg =

French businessman

- Born: 10 February 1951 (age 75); Boulogne-Billancourt, France
- Education: Sciences Po, ÉNA
- Occupation: Businessman

Serge Weinberg (born 10 February 1951) is a French businessman. He is the founder and chairman of Weinberg Capital Partners, an investment firm.

== Early life and education ==
Weinberg trained as a civil servant, after graduating with a bachelor's degree in Law from the University of Paris and from the Institut d'Etudes Politiques de Paris. He studied at the École nationale d'administration, the French School for Civil Service.

== Career ==
=== Career in the public sector ===
Weinberg started his career as a civil servant in the French administration (1976–81), before becoming chief of staff to Budget Minister Laurent Fabius (1981–82).

=== Career in the private sector ===
Weinberg later held several management positions at FR3 and Havas. In 1990, after three years as General Manager with investment bank Pallas Groupe, he joined the Pinault Group as CEO of CFAO. Next, he was appointed CEO of Rexel (1991–95). From 1995 to 2005, he was chairman of the management board of PPR, the largest non-food retailer in Europe and the third largest multi-brand luxury goods company in the world.

He is the chairman of Sanofi, a French pharmaceutical firm, known for its prescription products such as Lantus insulin.

== Other activities ==
=== Corporate boards ===
- Accor, Non-Executive Chairman of the Board
- Schneider Electric, Member of the Board of Directors
- Fnac, Member of the Board of Directors
- Artémis, Member of the Board of Directors
- Gucci, Member of the Board of Directors

=== Non-profit organizations ===
- Institut du Cerveau, Chair of the Board of Directors (since 2025)
- Club of Three, Member of the Steering Group
- Paris Europlace, Member of the Board of Directors
- Sanofi Espoir Foundation, Member of the Board of Directors

At least between 1998 and 2008 Weinberg was a member of the Trilateral Commission.
