= Pascal Boris =

French business investor

Pascal Boris CBE
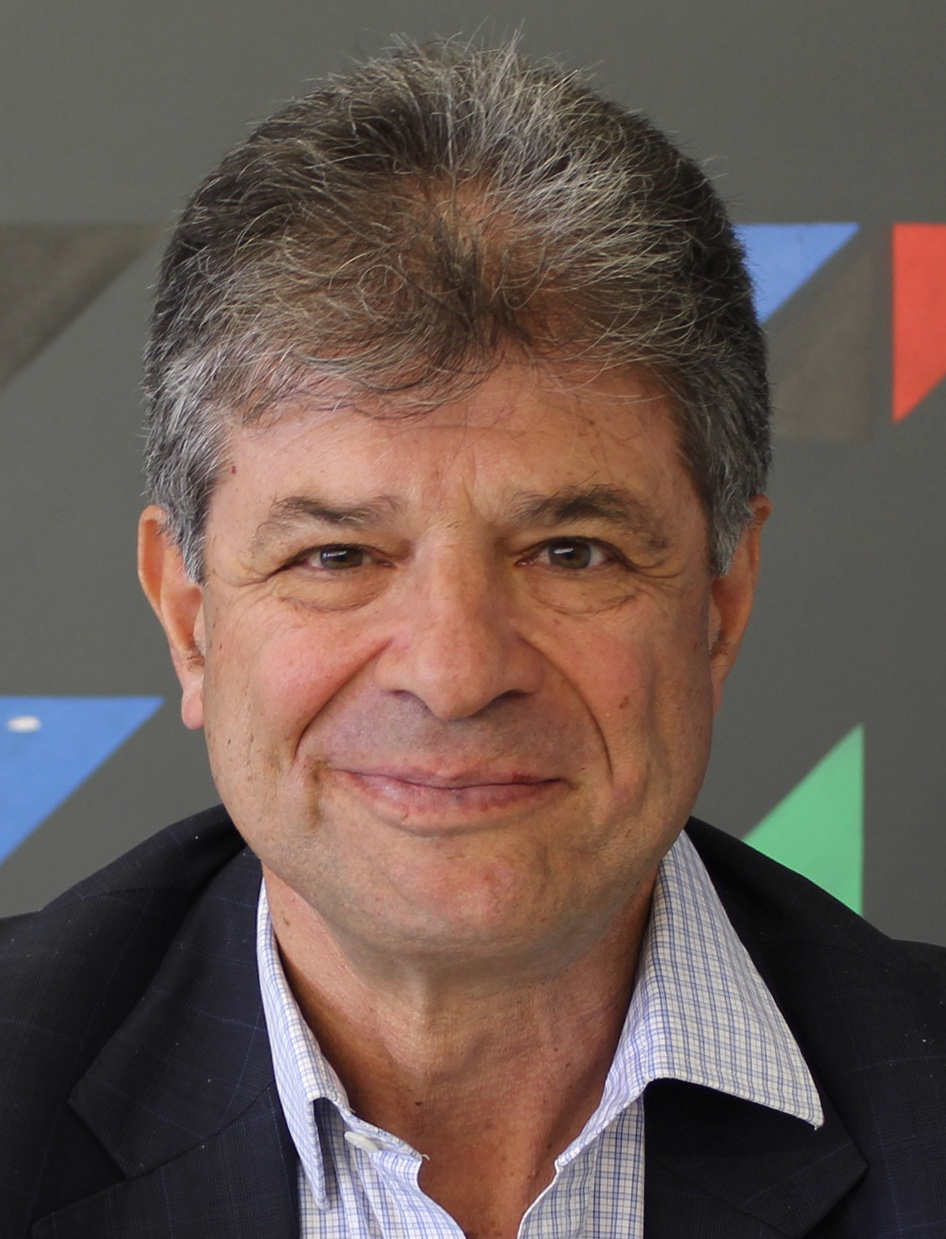
- Born: Pascal Boris; 1 February 1950 (age 76); Boulogne-Billancourt (Hauts-de Seine), France
- Education: Lycée Janson-de-Sailly; HEC Paris; Stern School of Business; London Business School
- Occupations: Business angel; director
- Known for: Investments in early stage technology companies
- Website: uk.linkedin.com/in/pascal-boris-63558b29/en

Pascal Boris is a French business investor. He also sits on a number of boards as a non-executive director (chair, remuneration committee, strategy committee). He is a former senior international banking executive. He was CEO of BNP Paribas UK (1999–2007) and CEO of BNP Paribas Suisse (2007–2013).

== Early life ==
Pascal Boris was born in 1950 in Boulogne-Billancourt (Hauts-de Seine), France. He is the son of Jean-Mathieu Boris, industrialist and Monique Hecker, international civil servant at UNESCO.

Boris attended the Lycée Janson-de-Sailly, Paris, before graduating from HEC Paris, from the London Business School, London, United Kingdom, and from the New York University Graduate School of Business Administration (today the Stern School of Business).

== Career ==
Pascal Boris started his career at the Chase Manhattan Bank (1975–1988) as a credit analyst, before being promoted in a number of international banking roles in New York, Geneva and London. He was appointed Managing Director investment banking at Chase Manhattan Limited in London, UK.

In 1988 he joined Paribas as head of fixed income in Switzerland; He became head of North America at the Paris headquarters in 1990. He moved to the London branch in 1992 where he grew the UK franchise as head of banking and structured financing. He was appointed CEO BNP Paribas UK in 1999, to implement the merger of Paribas and BNP in the UK.

In 2007, he was appointed CEO BNP Paribas (Suisse), a position he held until late 2013. He also served as president of the Fondation BNP Paribas Suisse (2007–2014) and ran the global international (except Asia) wealth management network of BNP Paribas from 2010 to 2013. He was appointed vice-chairman of BNP Paribas Wealth Management in 2013 and retired in 2015. He was a board member of BNP Paribas (Suisse) from 2013 to 2016.

In his role as a business angel, Boris is currently a non-executive director (since 2012) at Bankable, a London-based fintech and of ByzGen Ltd (since 2019). He joined the advisory board of Kazuar Advanced Technologies in 2018.

He served two terms as an independent director at Grant Thornton International Ltd from 2012 to 2018.

== Honors ==
Boris was appointed to Officier de la Légion d'honneur (Officer of the Legion of Honour), in 2011
