= Axa XL =

Bermuda-domiciled insurance company

AXA XL

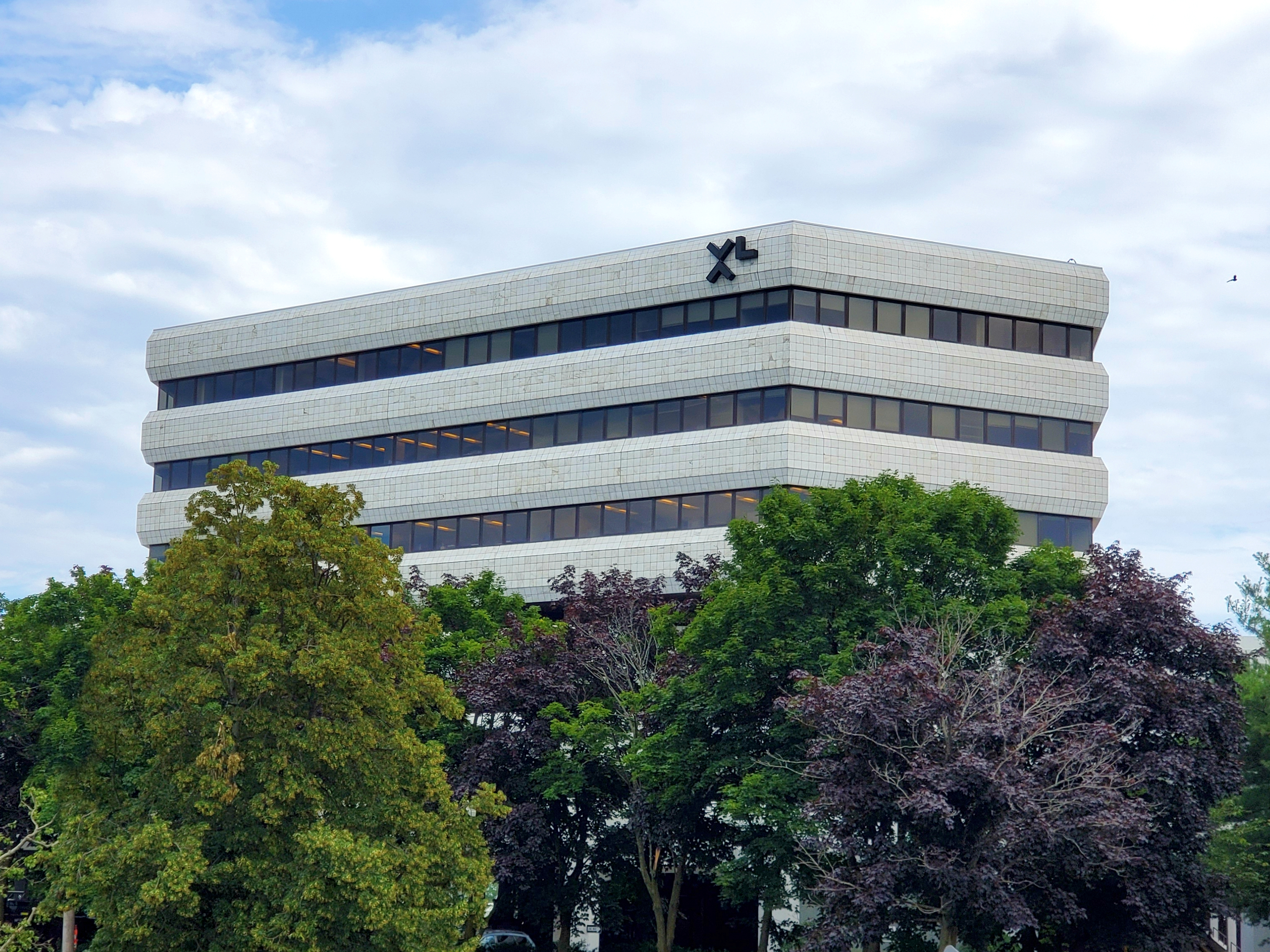
- Headquarters of Axa XL in Stamford, Connecticut
- Company type: Subsidiary
- Industry: Insurance
- Founded: 1986; 40 years ago
- Headquarters: Stamford, Connecticut, United States
- Key people: Eugene M. McQuade (chairman); Scott Gunter (CEO); Rainer Schoellhammer (CFO)
- Number of employees: 7,400
- Parent: Axa
- Website: axaxl.com

Axa XL is an American subsidiary of global insurance and reinsurance company Axa. It is headquartered in Stamford, Connecticut, domiciled in Hamilton, Bermuda, and has more than 100 offices on 6 continents.

In 2016, the company wrote $13.890 billion in gross premiums, of which 69% was insurance, 29% was reinsurance, and 2% was other. Of the company's gross insurance premiums, 19% was for professional liability insurance, 32% was for casualty insurance, 25% was to the energy sector, and 24% was for specialty insurance such as pollution insurance, aviation and satellite, marine, product recall, political risks, equine, and fine art insurance.

== History ==
EXEL Limited was formed in 1986 in the Cayman Islands by 68 Fortune 500 companies following the financial crisis of the early 1980s. Also in 1986, XL Insurance (Bermuda) Ltd. was incorporated in Barbados. In 1990 both EXEL Limited and Mid Ocean Limited changed domicile to Bermuda. In 1998, EXEL Limited merged with Mid Ocean Limited, and in 1999, EXEL Limited changed its name to XL Capital Ltd.

In 1999, XL Capital Ltd. founded Syncora, formerly known as Security Capital Assurance, a provider of bond insurance. Syncora became a public company via a corporate spin-off and initial public offering in July 2006. In 2008, during the 2008 financial crisis, to sever ties with Syncora, the company injected $2.5 billion into Syncora, which had stopped writing new business.

In June 1999, Bermuda-based XL Capital Ltd. acquired the NAC Re Corp, a United States insurance and reinsurance company, for $1.25 billion, including $200 million in NAC Re debt. Following the merger, the company established the subsidiary, 'XL America' in Stamford, Connecticut.

In February 2001, the company acquired Winterthur International, a property and casualty insurance unit that serves large businesses, from Credit Suisse for $600 million.

In September 2003, the company acquired Le Mans Re, an insurer based in France.

In June 2007, the company opened an office in Houston, Texas to focus on the energy sector.

In March 2008, Mike McGavick was named chief executive officer of the company succeeding Brian O’Hara.

As announces 12 January 2010, on 1 July 2010, XL Capital Ltd. (Cayman Islands) changed its name and domicile to XL Group plc (Ireland).

In April 2015, the company introduced a new venture capital fund called XL Innovate for technology products in the financial services sector. In May 2015, the company completed acquisition of Catlin Group for $4.1 billion in cash and stock.

In July 2016, the company changed its domicile from Ireland to Bermuda and its name changed from XL Group plc to XL Group Ltd.

In September 2016, XL Catlin acquired Brooklyn Underwriting Pty. Ltd., an Australian Sydney-based underwriter. Brooklyn became the trading name in Australia of Catlin Australia Pty Limited. In July 2017, Brooklyn opened branches in Melbourne and Brisbane, and moved its Sydney headquarters into XL Catlin Sydney offices.

In September 2017, the company moved its European headquarters from the United Kingdom to Dublin as a result of Brexit.

In September 2018, Axa acquired XL Group and renamed the division Axa XL.
