= International SOS =

Health and security service firm

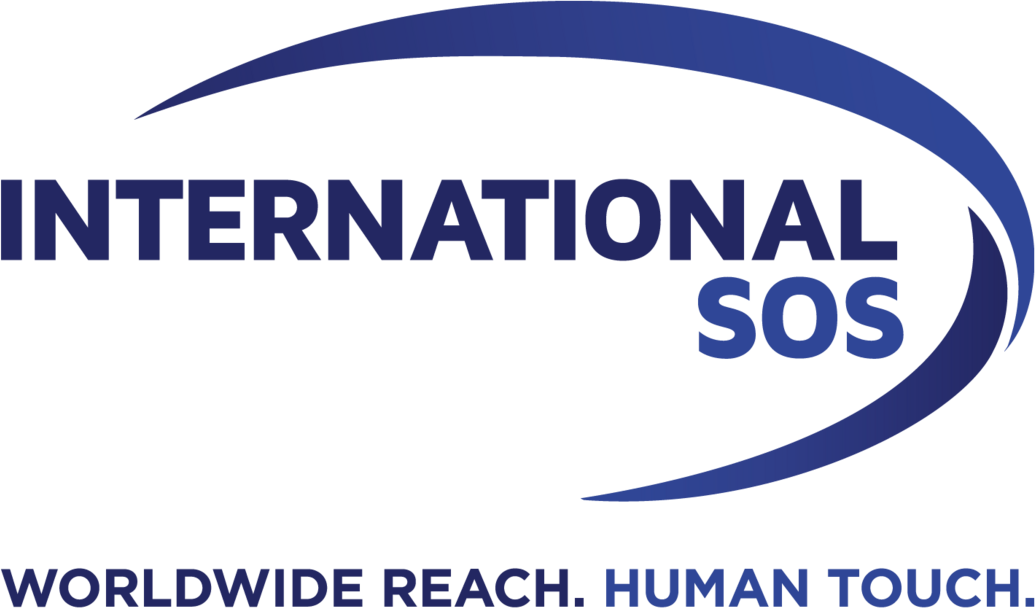
- Founded: 1985
- Founders: Arnaud Vaissié; Pascal Rey-Herme
- Headquarters: London and Singapore
- Area served: Global
- Number of employees: 13,000
- Website: internationalsos.com

International SOS is a health and security service firm. As of 2024, the company takes over 3.2 million assistance calls every year, and has approximately 60% of the Fortune Global 500 companies as clients.

== Services ==
International SOS aims to reduce exposure to and mitigate health, wellbeing and security risks for organisations and their staff. Their services include providing a feed of information on world events, assistance services, health consultancy and programmes, education, advice and medical equipment. It advises on preventive programmes and assisting with emergency response for employees, including domestic workers, business travellers, expatriates and their dependents. Its centres are staffed by physicians, nurses, paramedics, EMT's, security specialists, operations managers, multilingual coordinators and logistics support personnel who speak nearly 100 languages and dialects. It also has a global network of external service providers including specialist doctors, hospitals, ambulances, charter aircraft and security personnel.

The firm's Tracker service monitors the travel of 7.7 million people, helping organisations to know where their employees are in a crisis. The firm joined risk management consultancy Control Risks in releasing an itinerary-forwarding feature for their service, TravelTracker, in 2016.

The firm operates air ambulances services out of South Africa, Singapore, China, Papua New Guinea, and the Middle East. It airlifted 18,000 emergency cases in 2008.

International SOS also develops Quantum, a travel risk management platform that provides real-time risk information, geo-located crisis alerts, and access to medical and security expertise. The system offers tools for emergency notifications, traveler monitoring, and incident responses.

== Organisation ==
International SOS is a privately owned company. They work with educational organisations, corporate clients (including the majority of the Fortune Global 500), corporate clients, governmental organisations and non-governmental organisations (NGOs).

The firm has headquarters in Singapore and London. It operates worldwide via 83 offices and 28 assistance centres serving over 1,200 locations in 90 countries.

== History ==
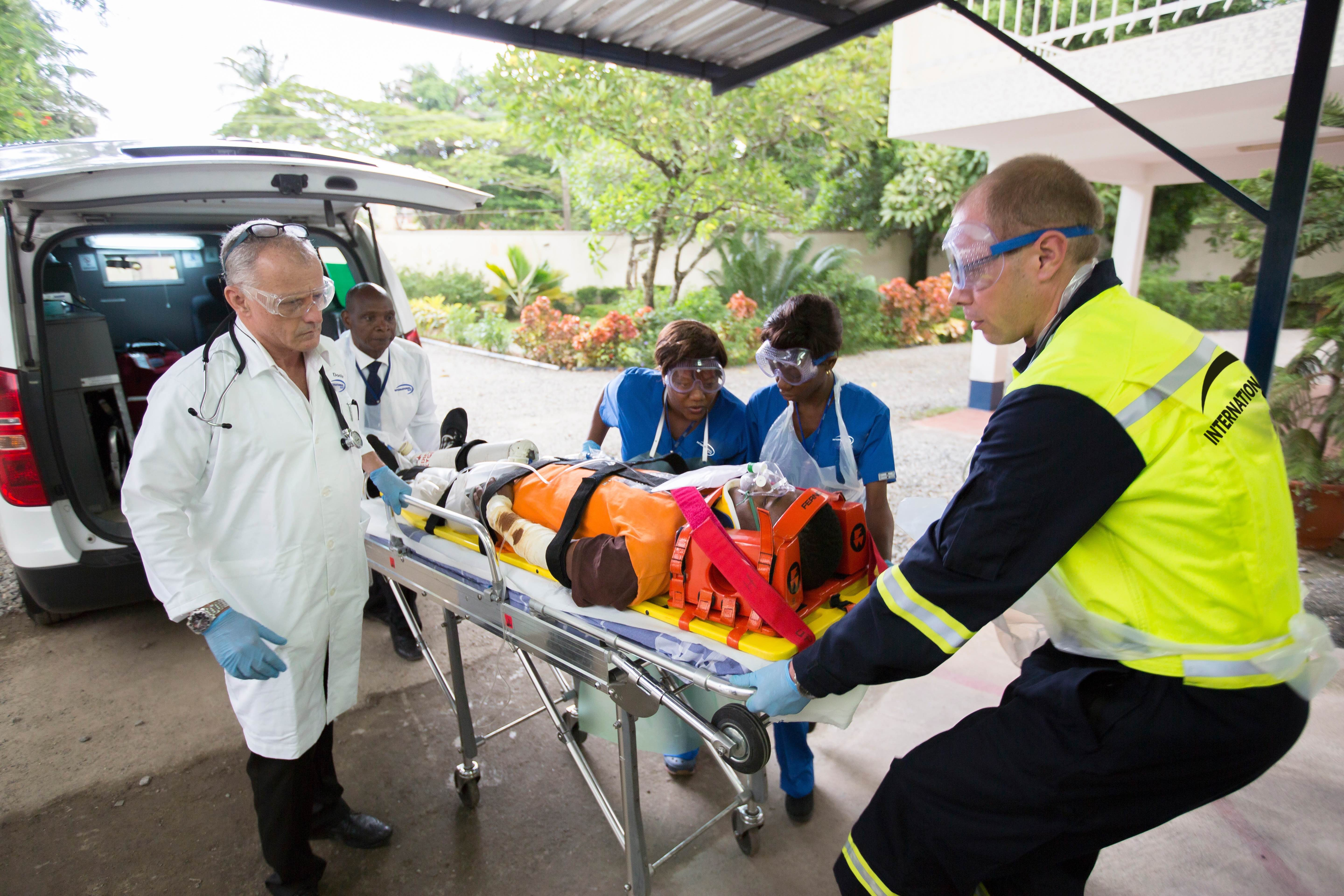
International SOS clinic staff moving a patient into their clinic in Lagos, Nigeria

Pascal Rey-Herme, a doctor, and Arnaud Vaissié, a businessman, founded AEA International a company registered in Indonesia (also known as PT Asih Eka Abadi) in 1985 to provide medical assistance services to expatriate communities and international organisations in Southeast Asia. Over the following decade, the company grew from its base in Singapore and Indonesia into a pan-Asian corporation, with operations in Hong Kong, Australia, Japan and mainland China. Key clients included oil and gas companies with operations in remote locations.

In 1998, AEA International acquired International SOS Assistance, a group of corporations founded in 1974 by Claude Giroux a Canadian entrepreneur, creating the largest medical assistance company in the world. Initially, it was known as AEA International SOS, and was renamed International SOS in 1999. The acquisition extended the company beyond Asia.

In 2012, International SOS moved its UK headquarters to Chiswick Business Park, West London.

=== Growth and acquisitions ===
In 2006, International SOS opened an Assistance Center in Dubai, where the company would manage services for the Middle East and northern Africa.

In 2008 the firm launched a strategic alliance with Control Risks to offer combined medical and security services, launching TravelTracker, and acquired MedAire, a provider of remote medical services for aviation and maritime founded by Joan Sullivan Garrett. The company would expand on its strategic alliance with Control Risks two years later, launching TravelTracker Mobile, an accompanying software to TravelTracker.

In 2009, the company acquired a majority stake in Abermed, a UK-based provider of occupational health and remote medical services to the energy sector. In 2010, it developed a strategic alliance with RMSI, an international rapid deployment medical and rescue service, with activities in Iraq, Afghanistan, Sudan, Somalia and Pakistan.

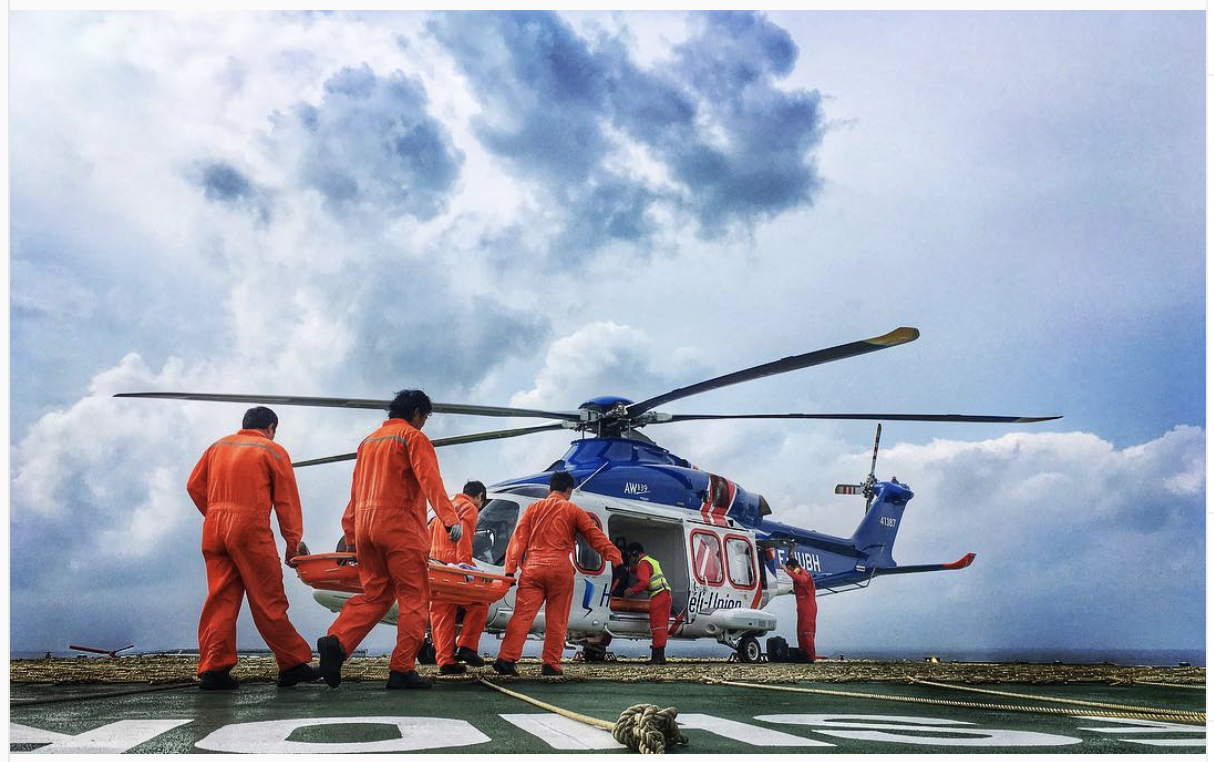
International SOS medical staffs performing offshore emergency MEDEVAC in oil and gas drilling platform in Andaman Sea, Myanmar.

In 2011, it merged with VIPdesk, a North American provider of concierge services, customer care and loyalty programs, acquired the medical supplies division of SMI (Service Médical International), acquired of L.E. West, EMC, Shenton Pharmacy and Nutracare Pharma, and launched a joint venture in Brazil with International Health Care.

In 2012, it acquired EMSM, a concierge and lifestyle company in South Korea. And in 2013, it acquired Norwegian companies SBHT, KBHT, Haugaland HMS, and Nordic Medical Services (NMS), and partnered with Aerosafety, a medical and aviation safety equipment company in Brazil.

In 2014, it launched Response Services Australia, a provider of emergency response, rescue and recovery services, entered a partnership with AMAS medical Services in India, acquired Aeromed in Mozambique, and created strategic partnership with West African Rescue Association (WARA), a clinic and medical services company in West Africa.

In 2016, it entered a strategic partnership with Everbridge. In that same year, International SOS became the first company in the world to be ISO/TS 13131 certified, dealing in the processes and practices of telehealth care.

In 2017, it entered a Duty of Care integration with Rocketrip, started joint venture partnerships with Global Excel and Iqarus, acquired International Health Solutions and launched a digital consultation service from Aberdeen Health Centre. It also started the world's first emotional support service for the mobile workforce.

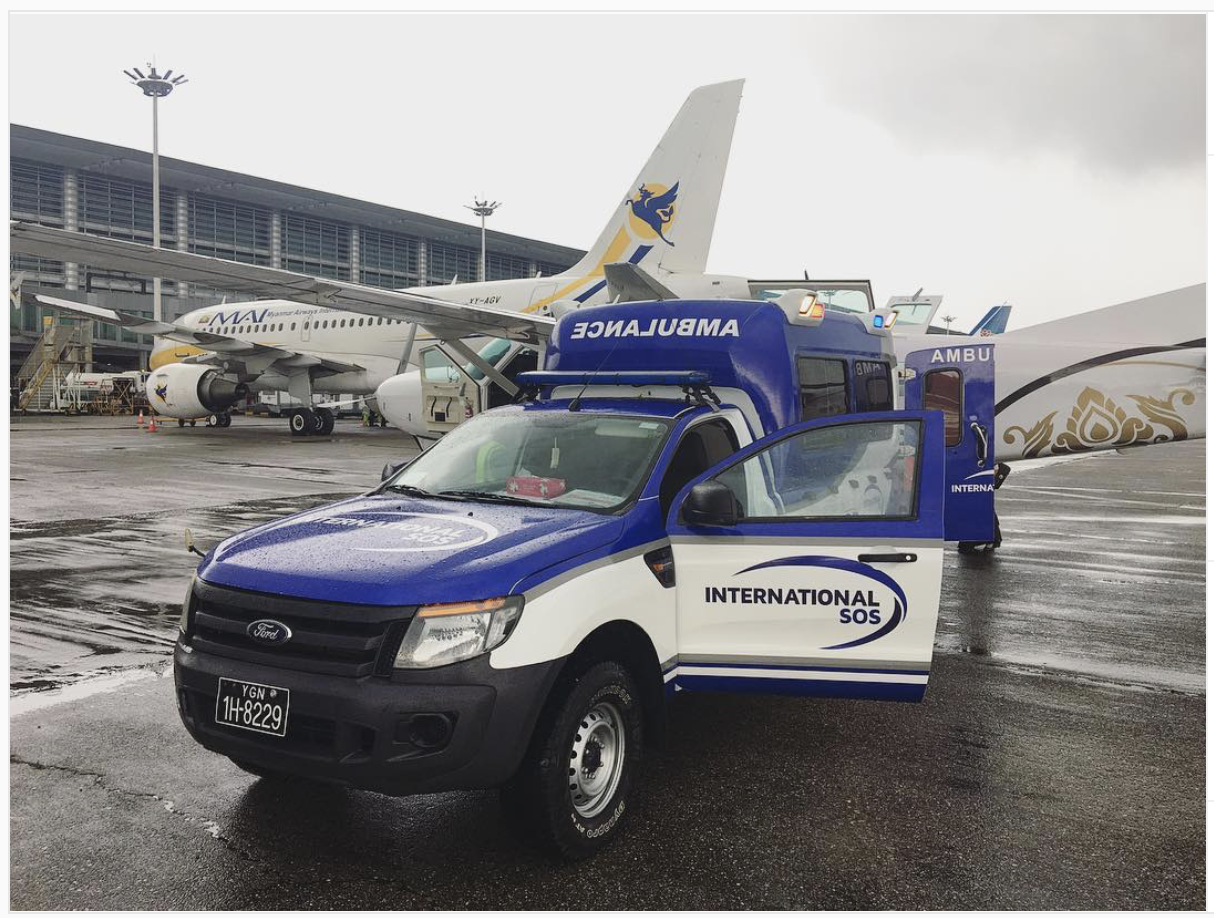
International SOS medical team evacuated an injured patient from remote area of Myanmar to capital Yangon with Cessna Caravan

In 2018, International SOS partnered with Al Rushaid to form a joint venture, providing medical services tailored to the construction, infrastructure and entertainment industries, while also providing services to the Saudi government.

In 2019, it took full responsibility of the services it was previously providing as part of the Control Risks joint venture, to provide its consolidated Security Services suite to clients.

In 2020, during the COVID-19 pandemic, it rapidly expanded its TeleConsultation services, part of its TeleHealth services, to over 30 countries. International SOS partnered with the International Chamber of Commerce in that same year to launch ICC AOKpass, an app for digital verification of COVID-19 compliance status.

In December 2022, the firm signed a Memorandum of Understanding with the Ministry of Foreign Affairs and International Cooperation of the United Arab Emirates to strengthen cooperation and partnership in providing health care services to UAE nationals abroad.

In 2024, International SOS partnered with Ontic, a software firm, to co-develop security-based software that supports remote employee safety and workforce risk management.

In 2025, International SOS partnered with SAF Aerogroup to jointly provide on-demand aeromedical services, including medical evacuation, disaster relief, crisis response, and humanitarian support internationally.

=== Major assistance ===
International SOS has provided medical advice, assistance, and travel safety services during and after a number of major incidents. These include the COVID-19 pandemic, the Jakarta unrest, the Mumbai terrorist attacks by helping those directly impacted by the event, and the Yemen crisis.

It has provided service during disease crises, including the provided medical assistance during the global COVID-19 pandemic, the 2003 SARS outbreak, the Ebola outbreak in West Africa, and the escalation of the 2016 Zika virus. It also provided assistance to victims of the 2002 Bali terrorist bombing and the 2019 Sri Lankan bomb attacks.

It has dealt with major natural disasters such as the 2004 Boxing Day Tsunami, the 2004 Indian Ocean earthquake, the 2005 Hurricane Wilma, the 2010 Haiti earthquake, the 2011 Tōhoku earthquake and tsunami, the 2014 Cyclone Pam in Vanuatu, the Sabah earthquake in Malaysia, the 2023 Typhoon Mawar in Guam, and offered security advice on 2024's Hurricane Milton and 2025's Hurricane Melissa.

The firm has also provided services to major sporting events such as the Summer Olympic Games in 2000, 2004, 2008, and 2012, and the 2010 Asian Games.

In 2006, International SOS's medical transports became the first direct flights between mainland China and Taiwan to be flown since 1949.

In 2021, International SOS coordinated a multiple patient COVID-19 evacuation from La Réunion Island to Paris.

In 2023, the company participated in providing support for multiple security escalations, including those during elections in Nigeria and Turkey, a coup in Niger, conflicts in Sudan and the Israeli-Gaza crisis.

In 2024, International SOS provided security advice and support during the Israel-Lebanon hostilities.

In 2025, International SOS delivered evacuation assistance and continued to supply security advice to entities during the Twelve-Day War. Additionally, the company provided similar services in regards to travel safety during the 2025 European and Mediterranean wildfires.

=== International SOS Foundation ===
The International SOS Foundation launched in March 2012 with a grant from International SOS as a registered charity that is a fully independent and non-profit organisation.

The Foundation has the goal of improving the safety, security, health and welfare of people working abroad or on remote assignments through the study, understanding and mitigation of potential risks. It has published, and acts as a repository for, a number of academic papers, articles and advisory notes on these topics.

In 2016, the Foundation introduced the Duty of Care Awards to recognise organisations and individuals who have made a significant contribution to protecting their staff as they travel and work overseas.

In 2017, the Duty of Care Summit was launched, bringing together industry leaders to share best practices in the safety and security of the mobile and remote workforce; this event took place on the day of the Duty of Care Awards.

== Recognition ==
List of recognition
| Year | Recognition | Sources |
|---|---|---|
| 2012 | The publication 'Duty of Care Benchmarking Study ' won 'Best Research Study of the Year' EMMA. | |
| 2015 | TravelTracker 6.0 won the Business Travel Awards 'Best Specialist Business Travel Product/Provider; the firm won Best Specialist Business Travel Product/Provider award - Business Travel Awards. | |
| 2016 | International SOS and Control Risks received the Individual Alliance Excellence Award from the Association of Strategic Alliance Professionals. | |
| 2017 | Risk Management Product of the Year, CIR Risk Management Awards for TravelTracker and Incident Management Services, International Healthcare and Risk Management Provider of the Year, FEM EMMA EMEA Award, and winner in four categories at the Americas EMMAs: Best Use of Data Analytics within Global Mobility, Most Innovative Use of Technology in Global Mobility - Assignee Management, International Healthcare and Risk Management Provider of the Year and Thought Leadership – Best Survey or Research Study of the Year. | |
| 2018 | International SOS Assistance UK LTD. Recognised as an investor in people, ISOA VANGUARD Award for Initiatives in post-conflict environments, Global Certification to ISO 9001 2015 Quality Management System, FEM APAC EMMA's AWARD. International SOS appointed as Fortune Global Forum's Preferred Medical Partner. | |
| 2019 | International SOS 'Event Support' won Best Specialist Business Travel Service. MedAire named Security Information Provider of Choice by top airlines. International SOS received the ISOA Vanguard Award for initiatives in post-conflict environment, awarded ISO 27001 Certification for Best Practice in Information Security Management, CIR Risk Management Award for Event Support. International SOS recognised as the International Healthcare & Risk Management Provider of The Year at the 2019 FEM APAC EMMAS. International SOS – Johannesburg, Angola, Nigeria and Ghana awarded The Prestigious Top Employer Africa Certification. | |
| 2020 | International SOS recognised as a Top Employer in the UK for 2020. | |
| 2020 | International SOS was recognised by the American Chamber of Commerce in Thailand for its corporate social responsibility efforts in the country. | |
| 2022 | International SOS was awarded the Best Practice Award by the BSI Group for its contribution to the development of ISO 31030 - Travel Risk Management Guidance for Organisations. | |
| 2023 | International SOS was awarded a bronze medal in the "best use of audio" category for its podcast at the Digital Impact Awards. | |
| 2024 | International SOS ranked among the winners of the 2025 Training APEX Awards. | |
| 2025 | International SOS was named as a finalist for Business Travel Partner of the Year - Duty of Care Provider by Business Travel Awards Europe. | |
| 2025 | International SOS was ranked among the Top Employers of 2025 in the United Kingdom by the Top Employer Institute. | |

== See also ==
- International healthcare accreditation
