= Dominique Senequier =

French businesswoman (born 1953)

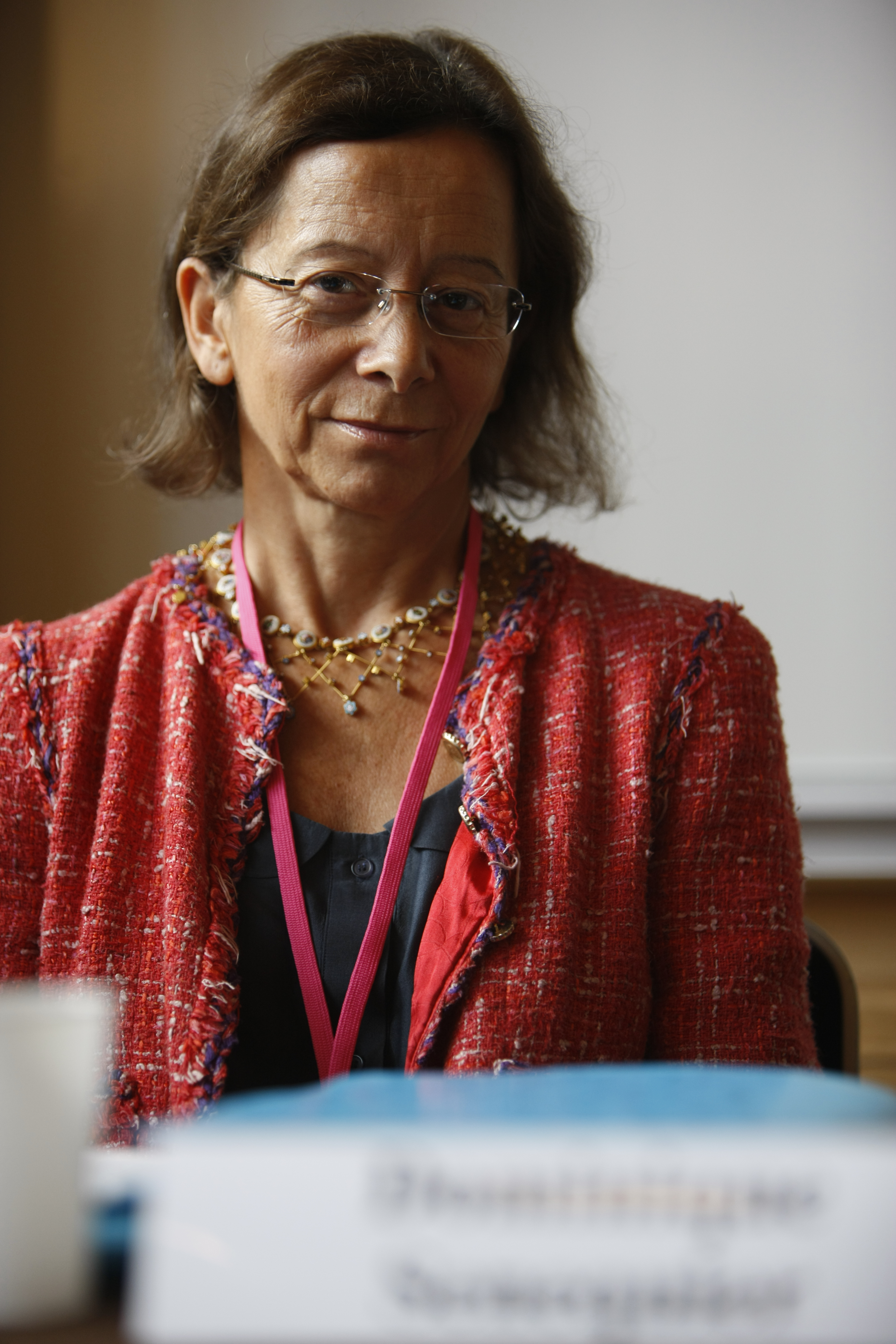
- Senequier in 2009
- Born: 21 August 1953 (age 73); Toulon, France
- Education: University of Sorbonne; École polytechnique
- Occupation: Businesswoman
- Known for: Founder and president of Ardian

Dominique Senequier (born 21 August 1953) is a French businesswoman. She is president of Ardian (formerly Axa Private Equity), a private equity firm she founded in 1996.

== Early life and education ==
Senequier attended high school at Lycée Thiers in Marseille. She holds a postgraduate degree in Banking and Monetary Economics from the University of Sorbonne.

She was one of the first seven women admitted to the École polytechnique in 1972, the year of its first female intake.

== Career ==
Senequier began her career as insurance commissioner for the French Ministry of Finance, where she worked from 1975 until 1980.

She worked in reinsurance, international development, and private equity at GAN, a subsidiary of Groupama from 1980 to 1996. She also created and developed the subsidiary GAN Participations.

In 1996, she joined the Axa Group and founded Axa Private Equity, which became the largest private equity company in Europe with $50 billion of assets under management in 2014. In 2013, she announced that the firm was separating from Axa Group; it became Ardian.

Senequier has more than 410 employees running more than 50 active funds in 12 offices around the world.

== Other activities ==
=== Corporate boards ===
- Hermès, Vice-Chair of the Supervisory Board (since 2013)
- Hewlett-Packard, Member of the Board of Directors (–2012)
- Compagnie Industriali Riunite, former Non-Executive Member of the Board of Directors

=== Non-profit organizations ===
- International Actuarial Association, Member

== Recognition ==
Senequier was ranked 66th on Fortune's list of Most Powerful Women in 2023. She was ranked number 50 on Forbes list of The World's 100 Most Powerful Women in 2009. In 2011, she was number 98. She ranked 16th in 2013, and 12th in 2014.

In 2012, Senequier was made a chevalier (knight) of the Legion of Honour.

In October 2013, she was named in the Bloomberg Top 50 Most Influential People in the world in Money Managers category.

== Personal life ==
She is a concert-standard pianist who enjoys opera, sometimes travelling to Venice and Salzburg to hear it.
