= Axa =

French multinational insurance company

AXA S.A.

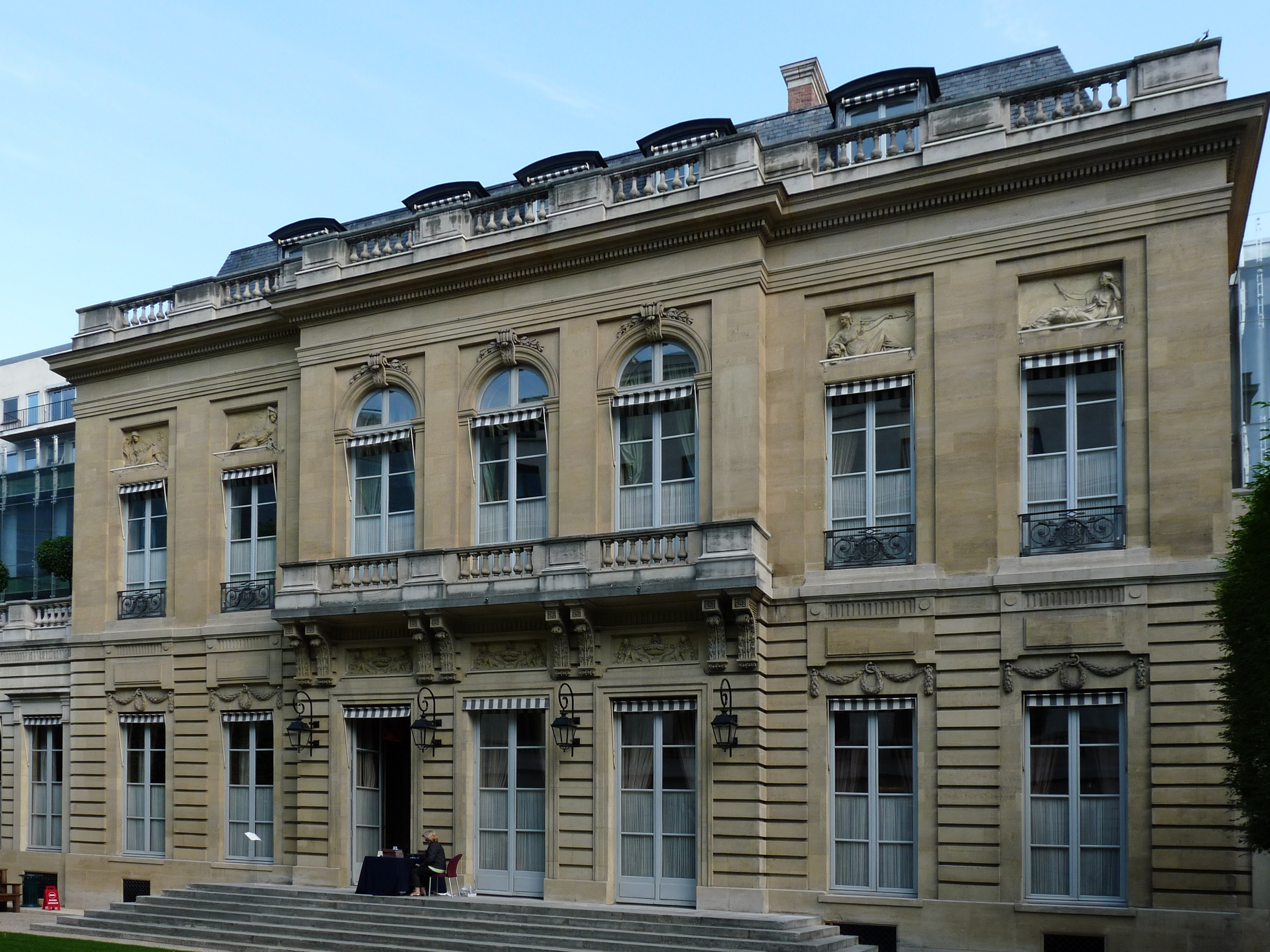
- Headquarters at Hôtel de La Vaupalière, Paris
- Type: Public (société anonyme)
- Traded as: Euronext Paris: CS; CAC 40 component Euro Stoxx 50 component
- Industry: Insurance
- Founded: 1817; 209 years ago in Rouen, France (Note: The founding year is not given consistently. 1817 is the year used by the International Directory of Company Histories, by the Mutuelles AXA and by the Bibliothèque nationale de France authority record for the "Groupe Ancienne mutuelle (1817–1978)"; 1816 is found in other accounts, among them Atlas Magazine. Axa's own corporate timeline dates the beginnings of the group no more precisely than to the early 19th century.)
- Founder: Jacques-Théodore Le Carpentier
- Headquarters: Hôtel de La Vaupalière, 25 Avenue Matignon, Paris, France
- Number of locations: 52 countries (2025)
- Area served: Worldwide
- Key people: Antoine Gosset-Grainville (chairman); Thomas Buberl (CEO)
- Products: General insurance; Health insurance; Vehicle insurance; Home insurance; Travel insurance; Life insurance; Pensions and savings; Reinsurance; Assistance
- Revenue: ▲€115.5 billion (2025) (2025)
- Operating income: ▲€8.37 billion (2025) (2025)
- Net income: ▲€9.80 billion (2025) (2025)
- Total assets: €635.5 billion (2025) (2025)
- Total equity: ▼€47.2 billion (2025) (2025)
- Number of employees: 156,000 (2025) (Note: Axa's headline figure counts tied agents and other non-salaried distributors as well as staff. Salaried employees numbered 100,041 on a full-time-equivalent basis at 31 December 2024.) (2025)
- Subsidiaries: Axa XL; Axa France; Axa Partners
- Website: www.axa.com

Axa S.A. (styled AXA) is a French multinational insurance company whose registered office is in the 8th arrondissement of Paris. It ranks among the largest insurers in the world by revenue and also sells assistance and related services through its subsidiaries. For 2025 the group reported gross written premiums and other revenues of €115.5 billion, more than 92 million customers in 52 countries and a workforce of about 156,000.

The company grew out of a small mutual insurance society set up at Rouen, in Normandy, in 1817 to insure against fire. It remained a regional mutual group, known for most of that time as Ancienne Mutuelle, until it took the name Mutuelles Unies in 1978. Between 1982 and 1989 Claude Bébéar turned it into the largest private insurance group in France winning contested takeovers of Drouot, of Présence and of Compagnie du Midi. The enlarged business took the Axa name in July 1985. Expansion abroad followed quickly. Axa took control of The Equitable in the United States in 1992 and of National Mutual in Australia in 1995, merged with UAP in 1996–97 in what was then the largest transaction French insurance had seen, and bought Guardian Royal Exchange in 1999 and Winterthur in 2006.

Under Thomas Buberl, chief executive since 2016, the group has moved away from capital-intensive savings business and towards property and casualty, commercial and health insurance. The purchase of the Bermudian insurer XL Group for $15.3 billion in 2018 gave Axa the leading global platform in property and casualty commercial lines, and was paid for in part by floating and then disposing of the American life business, Axa Equitable Holdings. The asset manager Axa Investment Managers was sold to BNP Paribas in 2025.

Axa S.A. is listed on Euronext Paris and is a constituent of the CAC 40 and Euro Stoxx 50 indices. Its largest shareholders are two French mutual insurers, together called the Mutuelles AXA, which at the end of 2025 held 15.64% of the capital and 25.78% of the voting rights.

As of 2024, it is the fourth largest financial services company by revenue in France, and the eighth largest French company. In 2023, the company was ranked 48th in the Forbes Global 2000.

== Name ==
Although the company writes it in capitals, "AXA" is not an acronym and stands for nothing. After the Drouot group was taken over in 1982, chairman and chief executive Claude Bébéar commissioned a computer-assisted search for a short name that would be pronounced the same way in any language, in keeping with the group's international ambitions. The first choice, "Elan", was abandoned when Canadian executives pointed out that élan is the French word for moose.

Bébéar later recalled that the name had come out of nowhere, and that it appealed to him because the group wanted to be first and the word began with the first letter of the alphabet. It was also short, it was easy to remember and it read the same backwards. The brand was launched in July 1985, when Mutuelles Unies and Drouot began trading under it together. Ownership of the trademark passed to the listed company only in 2005, when FINAXA, the holding company that legally held the brand, was absorbed into Axa S.A.

Interbrand rated Axa the most valuable insurance brand in the world for nine years running, a run the company last claimed in 2017, when it put the brand's value above $11 billion. In Interbrand's 2025 ranking it placed 43rd overall and second among insurers, behind Allianz.

== History ==
=== Origins in Normandy (1817–1945) ===
The oldest ancestor of Axa was the Compagnie d'assurances Mutuelles contre l'incendie dans les départements de la Seine Inférieure et de l'Eure, set up at Rouen in 1817 by the architect Jacques-Théodore Le Carpentier and seventeen fellow property owners. The first claim it paid, in 1819, came to 7.5 francs and prompted the company to build up a reserve fund. Its manager Adolphe Lanne split the business in 1847 into Mutualité Immobilière and Mutualité Mobilière; the two came back together in 1881 as Ancienne Mutuelle, alongside a newly formed life company, Mutuelle Vie.

The group gathered all its offices in Rouen in 1902 and began writing motor insurance in 1922 through Ancienne Mutuelle Accidents. Its chairman, Gaston Payenneville, was killed in the Allied bombing of Rouen in 1944.

=== The Ancienne Mutuelle group (1946–1974) ===
André Sahut d'Izarn took charge in 1946 and put together the Groupe Ancienne Mutuelle: Ancienne Mutuelle du Calvados was absorbed that year, the Mutuelle d'Orléans merged in 1950 and La Participation was bought in 1954. By 1955 the group held eight mutual companies and a number of subsidiaries, and had made its first move abroad, into Quebec. A new head office of 22,000 m^{2} (240,000 sq ft) opened at Belbeuf, outside Rouen, in 1968, and a reinsurance arm, Ancienne Mutuelle de Réassurance, later Axa RE, was set up in 1977.

After buying the Compagnie Parisienne de Garantie and the Mutuelle de l'Ouest, the group renamed itself Mutuelles Unies in 1978. Turnover then stood at the equivalent of some €160 million and it employed 1,850 people.

=== Bébéar and the creation of Axa (1975–1989) ===
Claude Bébéar, a graduate of the École Polytechnique who had joined Ancienne Mutuelle de Rouen in 1958, was made general manager in 1974 and chairman the following year, aged 40. Over the next fifteen years he turned a provincial mutual into the largest private insurance group in France by winning three contested takeovers in a row.

The first was Drouot, then the leading French private insurer, with 6 billion francs of premiums, left vulnerable by the death of the man who had run it for decades. Francis Bouygues tried to take control, the Hottinguer and Aaron families, who held 60% of the key holding company, took him to court, and Bébéar stepped in as a white knight, won over the shareholders and took Drouot in 1982. Axa's own official history admits the operation was carried through by force rather than by agreement. Within two years Drouot's annual losses of about $40 million had turned into a profit of $10 million.

The second contest came in 1986, when Bernard Pagezy of Compagnie du Midi bid for the Présence group, made up of La Providence and Le Secours and carrying 4 billion francs of premiums. Bébéar counter-bid in Drouot Assurances shares and won once Paribas, which held 25%, came down on his side in March 1986. Présence became an Axa company on 15 December 1986, and by the end of that year Axa was the third-largest insurance group in France, with 18 billion francs of premiums.

The third operation moved Axa inside a former rival. Under a protocol agreed with Assurances du Groupe de Paris in April 1988, Axa transferred its insurance business into the listed Compagnie du Midi, which then took the Axa name, which is why the modern listed company is, in law, the former Compagnie du Midi, incorporated in 1957. Generali, under Antoine Bernheim, had meanwhile built a stake in Midi; on 25 January 1989 Pagezy and Bébéar offered it two board seats in return for capping that stake at 20%, and at the shareholders' meeting of 28 February 1989 Bébéar carried a majority, Generali's votes included, and became president. Axa by then brought together 42 companies worldwide, 4,000 general agents and 16,000 employees, against 700 agents and 2,300 employees in 1980.

Bébéar built a shared culture across the assembled group through large corporate expeditions, among them a seminar in the Ténéré desert in November 1986 and the "AXA Europe Express" train journey across northern and eastern Europe in October 1988, used to bring the management of Assurances du Groupe de Paris together. He called his method managing by opportunity, and took the AIG standard of a 15% return on equity as the group's target.

=== Global expansion (1990–1999) ===
A reorganisation in October 1990 put a listed financial holding company, FINAXA, above the operating company Axa S.A.

Axa moved into the United States in July 1991, agreeing to put $1 billion into the ailing Equitable Life Assurance Society of the United States, a deal that also brought it the asset manager Alliance Capital and the investment bank Donaldson, Lufkin & Jenrette. The Equitable demutualised on 22 July 1992 and became a subsidiary of The Equitable Companies Incorporated, in which Axa held 49% of the common stock at first and 60.6% by the end of 1995. The holding company was renamed Axa Financial in 1999. In 1995 Axa took majority control of the demutualised Australian life insurer National Mutual Holdings, renamed Axa Asia Pacific Holdings in 1999; Forbes Global reported a price of $840 million, while Axa's own account gives A$1 billion for 40% of the company, rising to 51% once it was listed.

The decade's biggest deal was the merger with Compagnie UAP, the largest insurer in France, settled on 11 November 1996 and announced the next day as an exchange offer between equals. It created the leading French insurer and the second-largest insurance and asset management group in the world. Forbes Global put the price at $8 billion in Axa stock, and the target as much the weaker of the two: $42 billion of revenues in 1996 on a return on equity of 5%, a loss of 2 billion francs in 1995 and twice as many staff as Axa. Jacques Friedmann chaired the supervisory board of the merged group and Bébéar the management board, and the name Axa-UAP stayed in use until the last subsidiaries had been rebranded at the end of 1999. The merger also brought in the German insurer Colonia, which UAP had controlled since 1993 and which became Axa Colonia Konzern in 1997 and Axa Konzern in September 2001.

On 2 February 1999 Axa agreed a recommended offer of £3.4 billion for Guardian Royal Exchange, made through Sun Life & Provincial Holdings, the British subsidiary in which it held 71.6%. GRE was broken up at once: Sun Life & Provincial kept the British and Irish business, GRE Overseas went to Axa for £972 million, the German operations to Axa Colonia for DM 1.66 billion and the American ones to Liberty Mutual for $1.465 billion. That November Axa also agreed to buy the Japanese life insurer Nippon Dantai; the resulting company, Axa Nichidan, was formed in March 2000 and described by Axa as the first foreign-owned holding company in Japan since the Second World War.

=== Consolidation under Henri de Castries (2000–2016) ===
Henri de Castries took over the chairmanship of the management board from Bébéar in May 2000, when the group had revenues of roughly €80 billion and 50 million customers. Bébéar moved to the supervisory board and was made honorary chairman on 22 April 2008. He died in November 2025, aged 90.

The minority shareholders of Sun Life & Provincial Holdings were bought out in 2000. That same year Alliance Capital paid about $3.5 billion in cash and partnership units for the American research and asset management house Sanford C. Bernstein, producing a manager with $477 billion of assets. Donaldson, Lufkin & Jenrette was sold on to Credit Suisse for $8 billion, and in 2001 the September 11 attacks cost Axa €650 million.

An agreement to buy the MONY Group for about $1.5 billion was reached by Axa Financial in September 2003. The offer was lifted from $29.50 to $31.00 a share. A proxy campaign against it by the hedge fund Highfields Capital Management collapsed when the Second Circuit overturned a favourable district court ruling on 1 April 2004, and 53.4% of the outstanding shares approved the merger on 18 May 2004. It closed on 8 July.

On 16 December 2005 FINAXA was absorbed into Axa at a ratio of fifteen Axa shares for four FINAXA shares. The merger shortened the ownership chain, widened the free float and brought the Axa brand into the listed company. The Mutuelles AXA, which until then had controlled Axa through FINAXA, were left with roughly 14.3% of the shares and 23.3% of the votes.

The largest purchase of the period was announced on 14 June 2006: the whole of the Swiss insurer Winterthur, bought from Credit Suisse for CHF 12.3 billion (€7.9 billion) plus CHF 1.6 billion to refinance its debt, and paid for with a €4.1 billion capital increase and €4.8 billion of borrowing. Winterthur brought 13 million customers in 17 countries and CHF 153 billion of assets under management. Axa forecast annual pre-tax cost synergies of CHF 440 million by the end of 2008, against CHF 800 million of restructuring charges in 2007. The deal closed in December 2006. It also carried with it the German insurer DBV-Winterthur, whose German business was folded into Axa Konzern in May 2009.

In February 2008 Axa agreed to pay $1.5 billion for the Mexican insurance business of ING. ING Seguros ranked third in Mexico with 12% of the market, 5.5 million policyholders and 7,500 agents; the purchase completed that July and the company was renamed Axa Seguros. Axa later sued an ING subsidiary in New York, alleging misrepresentation in the sale and claiming damages in the tens or hundreds of millions of dollars.

Governance was simplified in 2010. Acting on a proposal from Jacques de Chateauvieux, chairman of the supervisory board, the shareholders' meeting of 29 April 2010 abolished the two-tier structure of management and supervisory boards in favour of a single board of directors, and de Castries became chairman and chief executive. Axa left the American capital markets in the same weeks. It filed to remove its American depositary receipts from the New York Stock Exchange on 16 March 2010, traded there for the last time on 25 March, moved to the American over-the-counter market the next day and deregistered with the SEC in June.

Several markets were then left behind. The Canadian operations went to Intact Financial for C$2.6 billion in 2011, and in March 2011 Axa agreed to merge its Australian and New Zealand business into AMP while keeping Axa Asia Pacific's Asian operations. In the other direction, Axa bought the property and casualty operations of HSBC in Hong Kong and Singapore, completing in November 2012 alongside an exclusive bancassurance agreement. A study of ownership links among transnational corporations published in PLOS One in 2011 placed Axa second among companies ranked by potential control over global corporate networks.

De Castries made his retirement known on 21 March 2016. Underlying earnings had grown roughly eightfold during his time in charge, to a record €5.6 billion in 2015, and debt gearing had fallen from 54% to 23%. The board split the two offices he had held, naming Thomas Buberl chief executive and Denis Duverne non-executive chairman with effect from 1 September 2016.

=== Thomas Buberl's tenure (2016–present) ===
Buberl set out his first strategic plan, "Ambition 2020", on 21 June 2016. It rested on two pillars, described as focus and transformation, and announced a move away from simply paying claims and towards acting as a partner to the customer. In practice it was carried out by rebuilding the group around commercial property and casualty insurance and by withdrawing from capital-intensive savings business in the United States.

The purchase of XL Group, a commercial property and casualty insurer and reinsurer based in Bermuda, was announced on 5 March 2018. Axa offered $57.60 a share in cash, a premium of 33%, which valued the target at $15.3 billion (€12.4 billion), and it presented the deal as creating the leading global platform in property and casualty commercial lines and as tilting the group away from life and savings. Completion followed on 12 September 2018, and XL was merged with Axa Corporate Solutions and Axa Art to form the Axa XL division.

Much of the money came from the American life and annuity arm. Axa Equitable Holdings was floated on 14 May 2018, when 137.25 million shares were sold at $20 apiece for gross proceeds of $4.02 billion and 24.5% of the company, the largest American initial public offering of the year up to that date. A secondary offering in March 2019 took Axa below a majority, from 60.1% to 48.3%, and the sale of a further 144 million shares that November raised about $3.1 billion. What was left, held through bonds mandatorily exchangeable into Equitable Holdings shares, was extinguished in May 2021, when those bonds matured and Equitable bought back 7.1 million shares from Axa.

The COVID-19 pandemic left the group with €1.5 billion of claims in 2020 and cut underlying earnings by 34%, to €4.3 billion. On 1 December 2020 Axa presented a successor plan, "Driving Progress 2023", organised around five lines of action: growth in health and protection, a simpler customer experience, tighter underwriting, continued leadership on climate and higher cash generation.

Disposals continued through the early 2020s. The operations in Poland, the Czech Republic and Slovakia went to Uniqa for €1.0 billion in October 2020. The Gulf businesses were sold to the Gulf Insurance Group in September 2021 for $269 million in all, and the Singaporean business to HSBC for $0.6 billion, announced in August 2021. Axa Bank Belgium passed to Crelan on 31 December 2021 for €691 million, together with a long-term agreement to distribute Axa products across the Crelan network. One disposal did not go through. The €1.2 billion sale of the Dublin-based variable annuity platform Axa Life Europe to Cinven, agreed in 2018, lapsed in August 2020 when its conditions went unmet, and about €3 billion of the platform's reserves were reinsured with a Munich Re subsidiary in May 2024 instead. The same announcement recorded that a sale of a closed German life and pensions portfolio to Athora, agreed in July 2022, had been called off by mutual agreement.

Antoine Gosset-Grainville took over from Denis Duverne as chairman in April 2022. The following year Axa reinforced its European health business by buying the Irish insurer Laya Healthcare from a Corebridge Financial subsidiary for €650 million, completing on 31 October 2023. A third plan, "Unlock the Future", covering 2024 to 2026, was announced on 22 February 2024.

Axa opened exclusive negotiations on 1 August 2024 to sell Axa Investment Managers to BNP Paribas. Signed on 21 December 2024 and completed on 1 July 2025, the transaction valued Axa IM at €5.1 billion in cash, or €5.4 billion including the investment-solutions business Select. The two groups also entered a long-term partnership under which BNP Paribas manages assets on Axa's behalf while Axa keeps full authority over product design, asset allocation and asset-liability management. Combined with BNP Paribas Asset Management, the business had about €1.5 trillion under management, and Axa began a €3.8 billion share buyback on completion.

At the same time the group was buying in Italian retail insurance. The €423 million acquisition of Gruppo Nobis, with an earn-out of up to €55 million, completed on 1 April 2025. On 28 November 2025 Axa took a 51% majority stake in the digital motor insurer Prima Assicurazioni for €0.5 billion, with call and put options over the rest expected to be exercised in 2029 or 2030. Chiara Soldano, chief executive of Axa Italy, put the combined outlay at close to €1 billion.

The annual general meeting of 30 April 2026 renewed Buberl's mandate as a director for four years and reappointed him chief executive for the same period.

In May 2016, the firm announced that it would stop investing in tobacco shares and bonds and allow its portfolio of tobacco-related bonds to run off.

In 2019, Axa partially disinvested from the Israeli arms group Elbit Systems following pressure from the Boycott, Divestment and Sanctions movement. The move followed several years of campaigning by NGOs, including an April 2018 petition launched by SumOfUs that received 140,000 signatures, leading Axa to "quietly reduce" its investments in Elbit and Israeli banks. Axa remains indirectly invested in Elbit and Israeli banks through a non-controlling interest in its former subsidiary Alliance Bernstein.

In 2023, Axa has increased investments in Israel as a shareholder in three Israeli banks known to support the Israeli occupation of the West Bank: Bank Hapoalim (US$9.99M), Bank Leumi (US$6M), and Israel Discount Bank (US$3.4M). By August 2024, however, AXA had completed a "full divestment" from all three banks, according an analysis by ethical-investing advocacy group Ekō.

In February 2023, the company sold a 7.94% stake in Banca Monte dei Paschi di Siena (MPS) to institutional investors. The package included approximately 100,000,000 MPS shares at a price of €2.33 (US$2.50) per share, for a total transaction value of €233 million (US$250 million). Axa retained 0.0007% of the Italian bank's capital.

Axa Investment Managers acquired France's Bry-sur-Marne film studio and the 12-hectare (30-acre) plot of land on which it is located for €150m in June 2023.

== Corporate affairs ==
=== Governance ===
Axa is a French société anonyme governed by a board of directors. Thomas Buberl has been chief executive officer since the board appointed him in September 2016, and Antoine Gosset-Grainville has chaired the board since the shareholders' meeting of 28 April 2022, when he succeeded Denis Duverne, chairman since 2016.

After the annual shareholders' meeting of 30 April 2026 the board had fourteen members, eight women and six men, nine of them regarded as independent under the criteria of the Afep-Medef corporate governance code. Its work is prepared by three committees: an audit committee chaired by Ewout Steenbergen, a finance and risk committee chaired by Ramon Fernandez, and a compensation, governance and sustainability committee chaired by Guillaume Faury.

The chief executive officer is assisted by a management committee, which has no formal decision-making power and had fifteen members on 1 September 2026, among them the group deputy chief executive officer George Stansfield, the group chief financial officer Alban de Mailly Nesle and the chief executives of Axa France, of European markets and health, of international markets and of Axa XL. A wider Partners group, made up of the management committee and about thirty other executives, meets at least twice a year.

== Headquarters ==
Italian Headquarters in Milan

Axa headquarters is located in the 8th arrondissement of Paris. Axa, which already owned 23 Avenue Matignon, acquired the former Hôtel de La Vaupalière, an 18th-century building, in the late 1990s. Architect Ricardo Bofill integrated the facade of the hotel with a modern glass building that covers the courtyard that the hotel also occupies. The complex serves as Axa's head office.

== Finances ==
Financial data in € millions
| Year | 2018 | 2019 | 2020 | 2021 | 2022 | 2023 | 2024 |
|---|---|---|---|---|---|---|---|
| Revenue | 117,100 | 124,964 | 101,707 | 110,654 | 92,124 | 101,147 | 107,866 |
| Net income | 2,306 | 3,627 | 2,987 | 7,099 | 6,494 | 7,004 | 7,130 |
| Assets | 904,944 | 757,908 | 777,617 | 738,521 | 657,060 | 644,449 | 653,762 |
| Employees | 104,065 | 99,843 | 96,595 | 92,398 | 90,443 | 94,705 | 100,041 |

== Operations ==
Axa Group global locations

=== United Kingdom ===
Axa trades in the United Kingdom as Axa UK, with subsidiaries including Axa Insurance, Axa Wealth and Axa Health. Axa PPP International was the trading name for Axa PPP healthcare's international health insurance division, which was later rebranded as Axa Global Healthcare on 1 January 2017. The company bought the online insurer Swiftcover, which was notorious for its controversial Iggy Pop TV advertising campaign, which was subsequently banned for being misleading, on the grounds that Iggy Pop would not be eligible for cover as someone working in the entertainment industry.

In September 2013, Axa Wealth was fined £1.8 million by the FCA for failing to ensure it gave suitable investment advice to its customers. The regulator says it found "serious defects" in the way Axa advisers in Clydesdale Bank, Yorkshire Bank and the West Bromwich Building Society advised customers on investments.

In 2018, they became the 'Official Global Insurance' partner of Premier League team Liverpool F.C. and in 2019, began sponsoring the training kits of the team. In 2020, the partnership was cemented further, when they purchased the naming rights to the club's newly built training centre, which became officially known as 'The AXA Training Centre.'

In 2016, Axa Wealth was sold to the Phoenix Group, which later changed its name to Standard Life plc in 2026.

=== Axa Health ===
Axa Health sells private medical insurance in the UK and was known as Axa PPP Healthcare until 2020. It was previously the London Association for Hospital Services, set up in 1938 as a private healthcare scheme for people of middle income in London. It was incorporated in 1940 with assistance from the British Medical Association, the King's Fund, and the medical royal colleges.

Guardian Royal Exchange Assurance bought it in 1998 for £435 million; a year later it was bought by Sun Life & Provincial Holdings, an Axa subsidiary.

=== Axa Global Healthcare ===
Axa Global Healthcare has previously been known as Axa PPP International, Axa Global Protect or Axa Healthcare Management. In 2017, the subsidiary Axa Global Healthcare became an independent Managing General Agent, selling and administering international health insurance products. While Axa Health provides insurance across the UK, Axa - Global Healthcare caters to those needing health insurance around the world.

In 2018, Axa Global Healthcare launched a Virtual Doctor service for its customers with outpatient cover and in 2020 offered it across all plans. Provided by Teladoc Health, it offers anytime access to medical advice by phone or video by doctors located around the world who speak more than 15 languages and is targeted at expatriates.

=== Axa Ireland ===
Axa established a presence in Ireland in 1999 when it bought British-based Guardian Royal Exchange, which had previously acquired PMPA. PMPA, Private Motorists Protection Association, was at the time one of Ireland's biggest insurance companies. It is the third-largest general insurer in the Republic of Ireland.

In August 2023, it was announced Axa had acquired the Little Island, Cork-headquartered health insurance company, Laya Healthcare for €650 million.

=== Axa Canada ===
Axa Canada marketed insurance in Quebec, Ontario, Western Canada and Atlantic Canada. In 2009 it had a total of approximately 2300 employees and 4000 brokers and advisors. The head office was in Montreal, Quebec. In 2011 it was sold to Intact Financial Corp. for C$2.6 billion.

=== Axa in the United States ===
Axa's activities in the United State primarily fall under Axa Partners SA, which includes Axa Travel Insurance marketed directly to consumers as well as various services and third-party administration provided to health, auto, home, and other insurers.

Axa previously owned life insurance companies in the US, including MONY (formerly Mutual of New York) and US Financial Life, and various entities under Equitable Holdings, Inc. (previously known as AXA Equitable Holdings, AXA America Holdings, The Equitable Life Assurance Society of the United States, and other names), but sold or spun off these holdings in the 2010s.

=== Mexico ===
In July 2008, Axa acquired ING Insurance Mexico, offering essentially the same services that ING offered. Axa then sued an ING Group subsidiary over alleged misrepresentations in the $1.5 billion sale stating it suffered "tens (if not hundreds) of millions of dollars in damages."

=== Australia ===
In 1995 the Axa Group purchased a 51 per cent controlling interest in Australian life insurer, National Mutual It was rebranded Axa. In March 2011, Axa agreed to merge its Australian operations with AMP under the AMP brand.

=== Africa ===
In April 2016 Axa unveiled a partnership with Lloyd's of London insurer Chaucer Holdings to enter the growing market of speciality insurance in Africa. Axa Africa Specialty Risks helps to mitigate risks through its coverholder, Chaucer Syndicate 1084 and Axa Africa Specialty Risks 6130. Axa ASR focuses on specialty and corporate lines, with coverage and an on-the-ground presence across Africa. Axa and Lloyd's both have excellent international financial strength ratings (AA- by Fitch and A+ by Standard & Poor's). The lines of business include: Political Risk, Political Violence and Terrorism, Energy, Construction, Property, Liability, Marine and Aviation. Since 2014 Axa has made several acquisitions of other insurers in an attempt to expand. Axa already operates in Cameroon, Egypt, Gabon, Ivory Coast, Morocco, Nigeria, Senegal and Algeria. Axa Africa also has a role in the trade between Asia and some African countries.

=== Kamet Ventures ===
In January 2016, Axa created Kamet Ventures, an insurtech incubator, to build disruptive businesses in the insurance, healthcare and assistance space with an initial funding of €100 million. Some of Kamet's investments include an insurance advice platform, Anorak Technologies and an elderly care platform, Birdie.

=== Axa Investment Managers ===
Axa Investment Managers (Axa IM), was a global investment management company with offices in over 22 locations worldwide. As of 31 December 2020, it managed over €858 billion in assets on behalf of institutional and retail clients. It operated as the investment arm for Axa. In December 2024 it was acquired by BNP Paribas.

=== Axa Hong Kong & Macau ===
Axa Asia Pacific Holdings Limited acquired MLC (Hong Kong) Limited and re-branded it as Axa (Hong Kong) Life Insurance Company Limited in 2006.

=== Former holdings ===
In 2010, Axa sold a UK business unit called SunLife to Resolution Limited.

In 2021, the Gulf Insurance Group acquired Axa's holdings in the Gulf region, rebranding them as GIG in the Middle East.

== See also ==
- Axa Investment Managers
- Ardian (formerly Axa Private Equity)
