= Claude Bébéar =

French businessman (1935–2025)

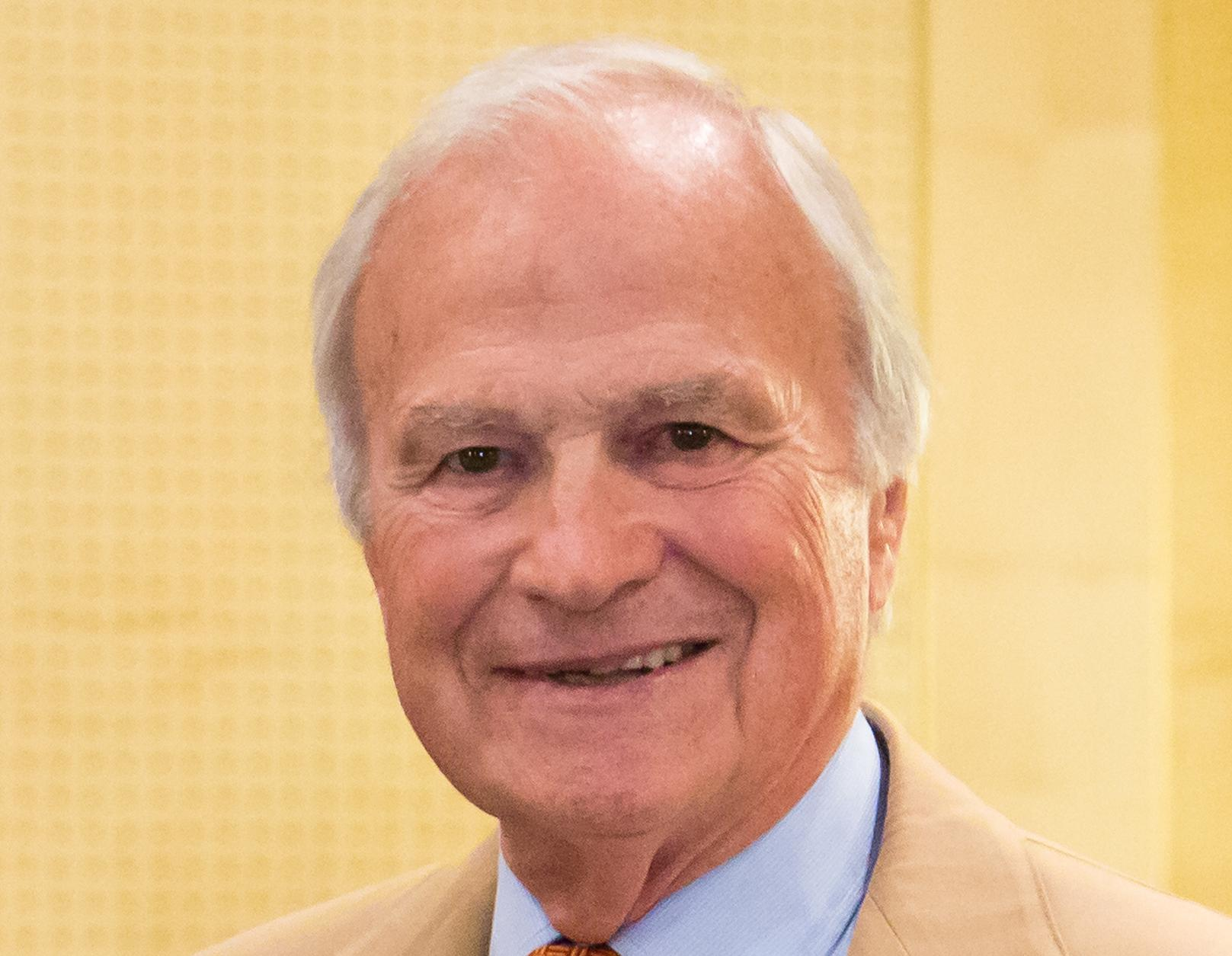
- Bébéar in 2015
- Born: 29 July 1935; Issac, France
- Died: 4 November 2025 (aged 90); France
- Education: École Polytechnique
- Occupation: Businessman

Claude Bébéar (29 July 1935 – 4 November 2025) was a French businessman. He was a onetime CEO of AXA.

== Life and career ==
=== Early life ===
Claude Bébéar was born in Issac, France on 29 July 1935. He graduated from the Lycée Saint-Louis and the École Polytechnique. Bébéar was trained at the Armoured Cavalry Branch Training School in Saumur and did his military service in Algeria. He then received a diploma from the Institute of Actuaries of France.

=== Career ===
Bébéar started his career at Anciennes Mutuelles, up until he became CEO after André Sahut d'Izarn's death in 1975. In 1985, it became known as AXA.

He helped out Jean-Marie Messier from Vivendi. He was involved in the ousting of the chairmen of Rhodia.

Bébéar was a member of the board of directors of Vivendi, BNP Paribas and Schneider Electric, and was a member of Le Siècle. He was also Chairman of the Institut du mécénat de solidarité and the Institut Montaigne.

=== Personal life and death ===
Bébéar was a Roman Catholic, widowed with three children, two of whom were adopted from South Korea. In 2007, he was worth €106 million.

Bébéar died in France on 4 November 2025, at the age of 90.

== Bibliography ==
- Le courage de réformer (André Babeau, Odile Jacob, 2002)
- Ils vont tuer le capitalisme (May 2003)
