= History of Airbus =

History of the aerospace corporation

Airbus is the product of several historical forces: the desire of European governments to create an aerospace and defence manufacturer large enough to compete with major American firms; the consolidation of the sector following the dissolution of the Soviet Union and the ensuing "peace dividend", which raised concerns that companies could be acquired by non-European firms; and efforts to privatise state-owned companies.

The company traces its origins to the formation of the Airbus Industrie GIE, a consortium of European aerospace companies established in 1970 to produce a wide-body aircraft to compete with American-built airliners. France's state-owned Aérospatiale owned 37.9% of Airbus Industrie, West Germany's Deutsche Airbus also owned 37.9%, British Aerospace held 20%, and Spain's largely state-owned CASA owned 4.2%.

In 2000, the European Aeronautic Defence and Space Company (EADS) was established through the merger of Aérospatiale and Matra of France, DASA (the successor to Deutsche Airbus) of Germany, and CASA. EADS held 100% of Eurocopter S.A., established in 1992 and later renamed Airbus Helicopters, along with 80% of Airbus Industrie GIE, which was quickly reorganised as Airbus S.A.S., a simplified joint-stock company. In 2006, EADS acquired the remaining 20% of Airbus S.A.S. from BAE Systems (the successor of British Aerospace). EADS was renamed Airbus Group N.V. in 2014 and Airbus Group S.E. in 2015.

Airbus S.A.S. and Airbus Group S.E. were merged in January 2017, and in April 2017 the combined entity adopted the name Airbus SE. Since then, Airbus SE has owned the commercial aircraft manufacturing operations while also serving as the parent company of the other two divisions, Airbus Defence and Space and Airbus Helicopters.

== 1970–2000: Airbus Industrie GIE ==
For the purpose of strengthening European co-operation in the field of aviation technology and thereby promoting economic and technological progress in Europe, to take appropriate measures for the joint development and production of an Airbus.

— Airbus Mission Statement

Airbus Industrie originated from a collaborative effort among European aviation firms to compete with American manufacturers such as Boeing, McDonnell Douglas, and Lockheed.

Although many European aircraft were technically innovative, even the most successful models had relatively small production runs. Several factors favoured the dominance of American manufacturers, including the large domestic market in the United States—which made air transport commercially viable on a broad scale—a 1942 Anglo-American agreement assigning transport aircraft production to the U.S., and the postwar legacy of "a profitable, vigorous, powerful and structured aeronautical industry" in America.

By the mid-1960s, several European aircraft manufacturers had proposed designs for large-capacity jetliners, but none had proceeded to production due to the financial risks involved. European governments and aerospace firms increasingly recognised that collaboration would be essential to compete with American manufacturers. The Airbus program formally took shape in 1965, when France and West Germany began discussions on a joint effort to develop a high-capacity, short-haul transport. At that year's Paris Air Show, major European airlines outlined their requirements for a new "Airbus" capable of carrying 100 or more passengers over short to medium ranges at low cost. The word airbus at this point was a generic aviation term for a larger commercial aircraft, and was considered acceptable in multiple languages, including French.

Later that year, Hawker Siddeley—encouraged by the British government—teamed with Breguet Aviation and Nord Aviation of France to study potential designs, producing the HBN 100 concept, a wide-body, twin-engine, 260-seat aircraft that became the foundation of the project. In 1966, officials announced that Sud Aviation of France, Arge Airbus (a group of West German aerospace firms), and Hawker Siddeley would jointly study the development of a 300-seat airliner for the short-haul sector. Rolls-Royce of the UK would be tasked with developing the engines. The partners submitted a joint funding request in October 1966, and on 25 July 1967, the three governments agreed to proceed with design studies. Following this agreement, Roger Béteille was appointed technical director for the project.

The initial 300-seat concept, dubbed the Airbus A300, attracted only limited airline interest, in large part because the Rolls-Royce RB207 engine intended for the aircraft was still in early development and represented a major risk. The RB207 had already suffered difficulties and delays, since Rolls-Royce was concentrating its efforts on the development of the RB211 for the Lockheed L-1011. Further exacerbating problems, Rolls-Royce entered bankruptcy in 1971.

To make the project more viable, the partners scaled the design down to a 250-seat version initially called the A250, later becoming the A300B, an airliner which could use existing engines like the RB211, General Electric CF6 or Pratt & Whitney JT9D. This dramatically reduced development costs, as development of the RB207 represented a large proportion of the costs.

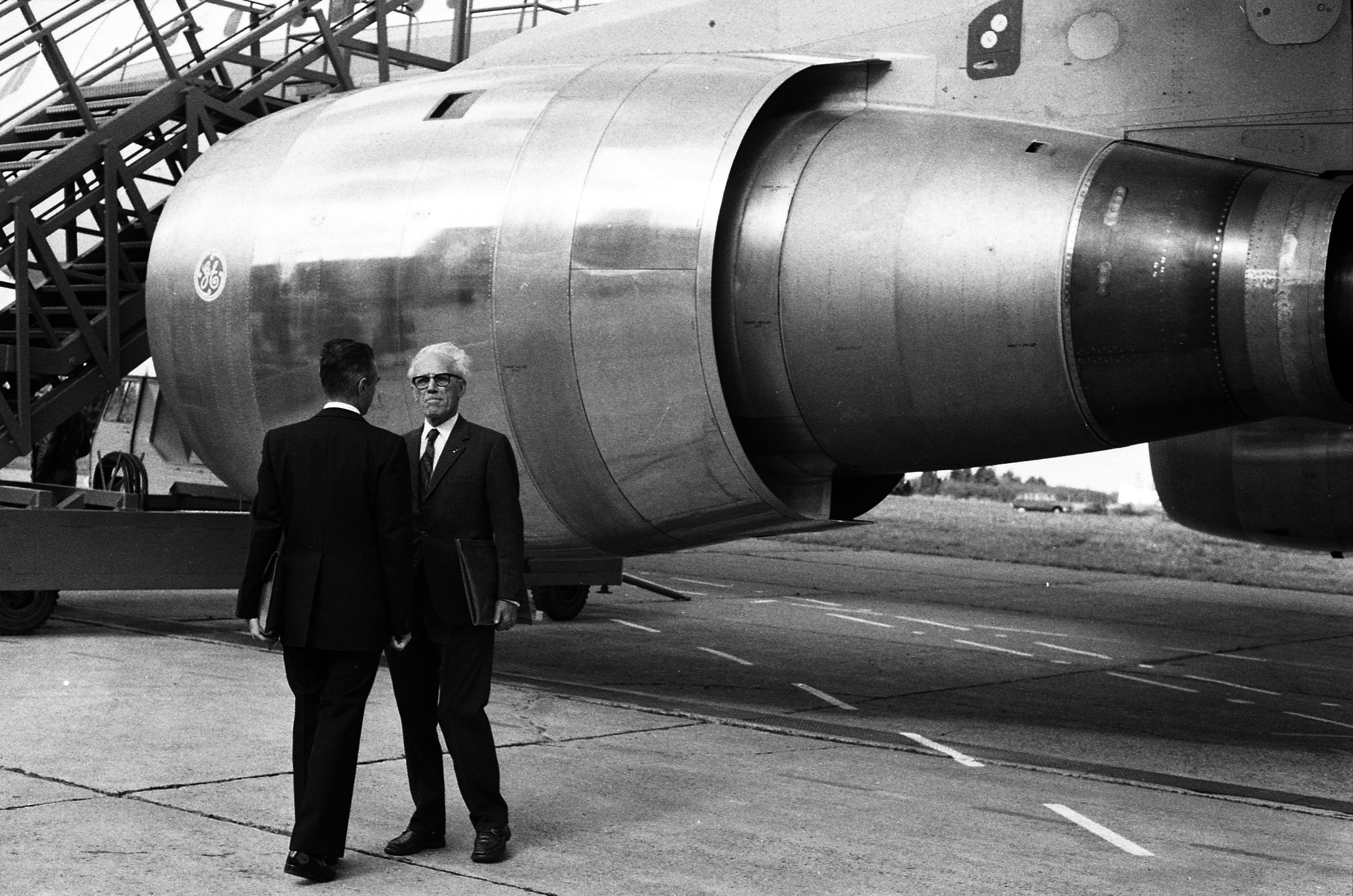
Technical director Roger Béteille (from behind) discussing with general manager Henri Ziegler beside the CF6 turbofan, which powered the A300 first flight

The memorandum of understanding between the three governments required that 75 orders be secured by 31 July 1968, but only 15 would be sold by the aircraft's first flight, raising serious doubts among the partners. The French government considered withdrawing over concerns about financing the A300 alongside the Concorde and Dassault Mercure, but was persuaded by Béteille and Henri Ziegler in 1969 to remain committed. The British government, meanwhile, questioned the project's viability, feared it would not recover its investment, and was frustrated by the abandonment of the RB207 engine; it formally withdrew on 10 April 1969.

In response, West Germany offered to contribute up to 50% of the project's costs if France matched the contribution, which it did. Hawker Siddeley's managing director, Arnold Alexander Hall, decided the company would remain involved as a preferred sub-contractor, ultimately investing £35 million of its own funds, along with an additional £35 million loan from the West German government.

Airbus Industrie was formally established as a groupement d'intérêt économique (GIE; lit. 'grouping of mutual economic interest') on 18 December 1970. The consortium, founded under French law, pooled the resources of the partner companies while allowing them to retain commercial independence. It was founded as a 50-50 partnership between West Germany's Deutsche Airbus—a joint venture in which MBB held a 65% stake and VFW-Fokker 35%—and France's state-owned Aérospatiale—formed from the merger of Nord and Sud Aviation. In October 1971, Spain's Construcciones Aeronáuticas S.A. (CASA) joined the consortium with a 4.2% share, reducing the holdings of Aérospatiale and Deutsche Airbus to 47.9% each. In January 1979, British Aerospace, which had absorbed Hawker Siddeley in 1977, joined Airbus Industrie as a full partner with a 20% share. The majority shareholders each reduced their stakes to 37.9%, while CASA retained its 4.2%.

- Airbus (est. 2000, renamed 2017)
  - - Aérospatiale‑Matra (est. 1999)
      - Aérospatiale (est. 1970)
        - Nord Aviation (est. 1957)
          - SFECMAS
            (est. 1936)
          - SNCAN
            (est. 1936)
        - SEREB
          (est. 1957)
        - Sud Aviation (est. 1957)
          - SNCASO
            (est. 1936)
          - SNCASE
            (est. 1937)
      - Matra
        (est. 1937)
  - CASA
    (est. 1923)
  - - DASA (est. 1989)
      - Daimler-Benz
        (aerospace unit, est. 1926)
      - Dornier
        (est. 1922)
      - MBB (est. 1968)
        - Messerschmitt
          (est. 1938)
        - Bölkow
          (est. 1948)
        - Hamburger Flugzeugbau
          (est. 1933)
        - VFW (est. 1964, acquired 1981)
          - Focke-Wulf
            (est. 1923)
          - Weser Flugzeugbau
            (est. 1934)

Béteille devised a division of labour that would define Airbus production for decades: Aérospatiale would build the cockpit, flight controls, and lower centre fuselage; Hawker Siddeley—whose Trident aircraft had impressed Béteille—would produce the wings; MBB would construct the fuselage sections; VFW-Fokker would manufacture the flaps and spoilers in the Netherlands, and CASA would make the horizontal tailplane. Each firm was responsible for delivering its sections as fully equipped, ready-to-fly components.

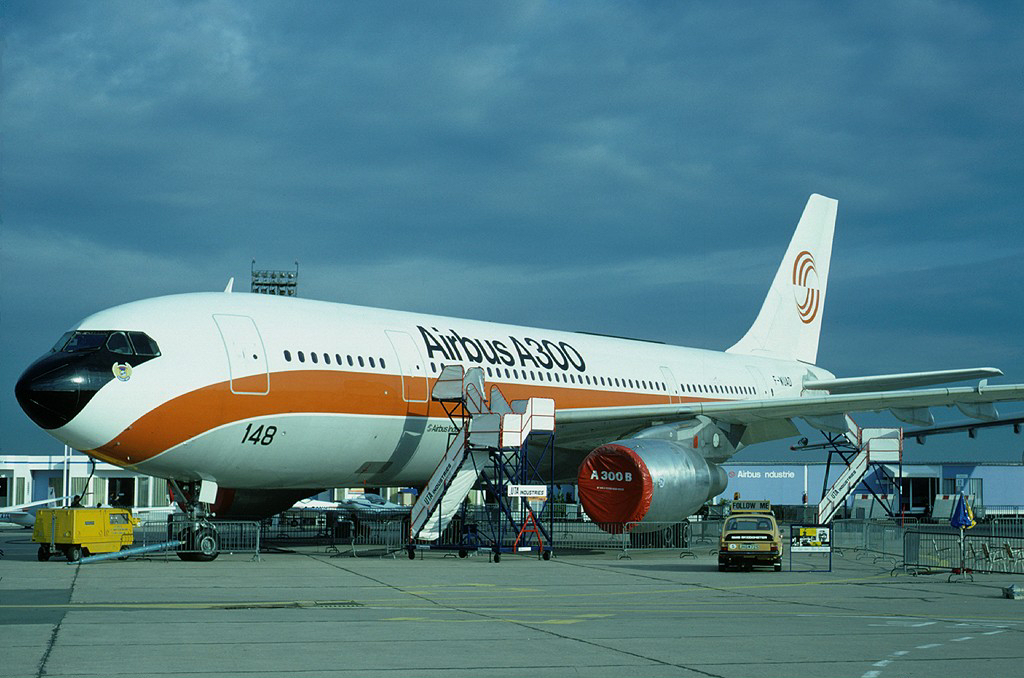
The A300, shortly after it was rolled out from the factory on 28 September 1972

The Airbus A300 made its maiden flight in 1972, and the first production model, the A300B2, entered service with Air France in 1974. Its debut was overshadowed by the contemporaneous launch of the supersonic Concorde, and initial sales were slow, with most orders coming from European flag carriers—such as Air France and Lufthansa—that were expected to support domestic industry.

Under chief executive Bernard Lathière, Airbus adopted a more aggressive sales strategy aimed at airlines in the United States and Asia. However, between December 1975 and May 1977 no new orders were placed, several completed aircraft remained unsold in Toulouse, and production slowed to half an aircraft per month. At the time, some government officials even proposed ending the program.

The A300's initial market appeal was limited: it was too large for most short-haul routes yet restricted from long-haul operations because twin-engine aircraft were not then permitted to fly extended over-water routes. The situation changed with the introduction of Extended-range Twin-engine Operations Performance Standards (ETOPS). In 1976, the International Civil Aviation Organization authorised the A300 to fly routes up to 90 minutes from a diversion airport on one engine, enabling operations across the North Atlantic, the Bay of Bengal, and the Indian Ocean. In 1985, the U.S. Federal Aviation Administration extended this limit to 120 minutes.

These regulatory changes transformed the A300 into a lighter and more economical alternative to three-engined wide-body jets, leading to renewed airline interest and a sharp rise in sales.

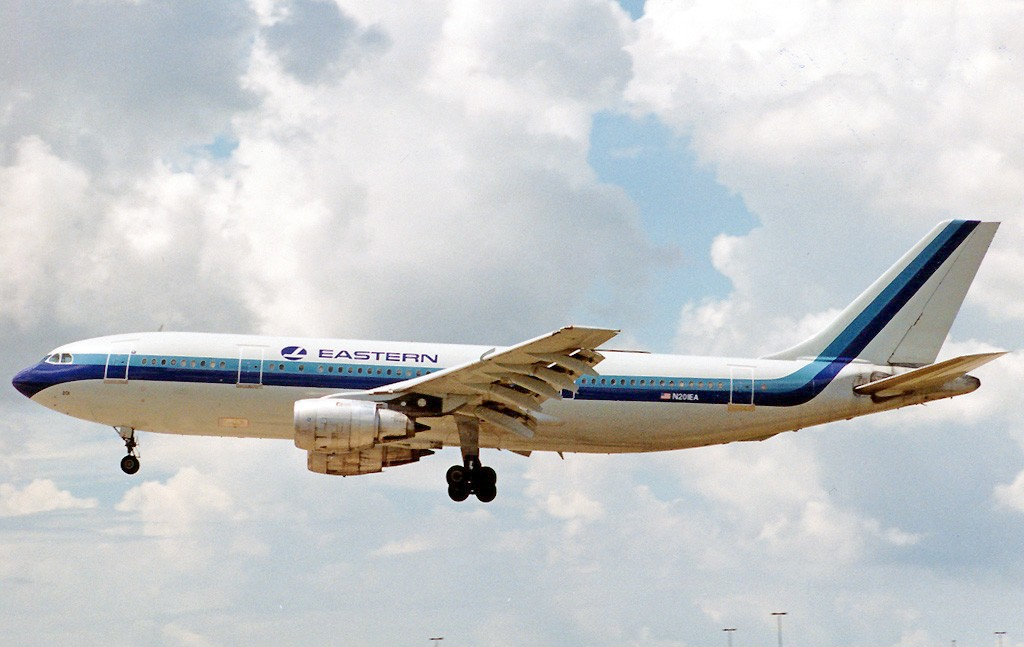
Eastern Air Lines introduced the A300 in the US market in 1977

In 1977, US carrier Eastern Air Lines leased four A300s as an in-service trial. CEO Frank Borman was impressed that the A300 consumed 30% less fuel, even less than expected, than Eastern's fleet of L-1011s. Borman proceeded to order 23 A300s to replace the airline's aging DC-9s and 727-100s, becoming the first U.S. customer for the type. The Eastern Air Lines breakthrough was shortly followed by an order from Pan Am. From then on, the A300 family sold well, eventually reaching a total of 561 delivered aircraft.

In 1978, Airbus launched the A310, a shrink of the A300 that also added new technologies. The introduction of the A320 in 1987 established Airbus as a major global manufacturer, with more than 400 orders before its first flight.

In June 1997, John Weston, managing director of the defence division of British Aerospace (BAe), commented, "Europe ... is supporting three times the number of contractors on less than half the budget of the U.S." That reality prompted European governments to seek the merger of their defence manufacturers into a single entity.

As early as 1995, DaimlerChrysler Aerospace (DASA), which had already consolidated most of Germany's aerospace and defence companies, and BAe, were reportedly eager to create a transnational company. The two companies also envisioned including the French company Aérospatiale—the other major European aerospace company—but only after its privatisation. One of the sticking points for the merger was the perceived need to transform Airbus Industrie from a consortium into a standalone company. Aérospatiale was vehemently opposed to this move, as a combined BAe/DASA would hold 57.9% of the new company, giving it effective control.

Merger discussions began between BAe and DASA in July 1998, just as French participation became more likely with the announcement that Aérospatiale was to merge with the aerospace, defence and telecommunications division of the French conglomerate Matra, which would dilute the French government’s shareholding. A merger agreement was reached between BAe Chairman Richard Evans and DASA CEO Jürgen Schrempp in December 1998. However, when the General Electric Company put its defence electronics business, Marconi Electronic Systems (MES), up for sale on 22 December 1998, British Aerospace abandoned the DASA merger in favour of purchasing its British rival. Evans stated in 2004 that his fear had been that an American defence contractor would acquire MES and challenge the combined BAe/DASA. The merger of BAe and MES to form BAE Systems was announced on 19 January 1999 and completed on 30 November.

DASA and the Spanish aircraft company Construcciones Aeronáuticas agreed to merge, signing a memorandum of understanding on 11 June 1999. On 14 October 1999, DASA agreed to merge with Aérospatiale-Matra to create the European Aeronautic Defence and Space Company.

== 2000–2014: European Aeronautic Defence and Space Company NV (EADS) ==
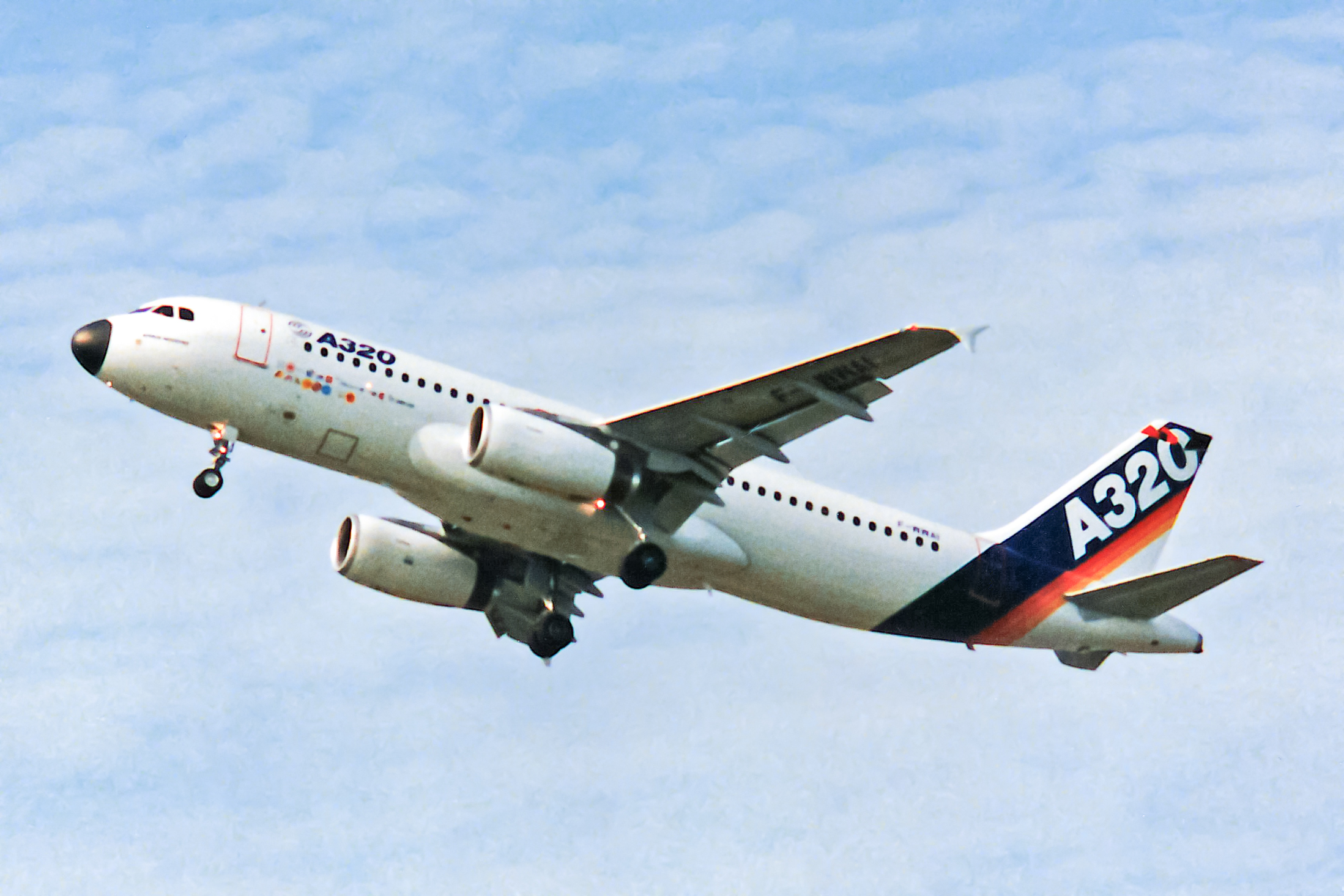
Airbus A320, the first model in the A318, A319, A320 and A321 family, introduced in 1988

10 July 2000 was "day one" for the new company, which became the world's second-largest aerospace company after Boeing and the second-largest European arms manufacturer after BAE Systems.

In January 2001 Airbus Industrie was transformed from an inherently inefficient consortium structure to a formal joint stock company, with legal and tax procedures being finalised on 11 July. Both EADS and BAE transferred ownership of their Airbus factories to the new Airbus SAS in return for 80% and 20% shares in the new company respectively. In April 2001, EADS agreed to merge its missile businesses with those of BAE Systems and Alenia Marconi Systems (BAE/Finmeccanica) to form MBDA. EADS took a 37.5 % share of the new company that was formally established in December 2001 and which thus became the world's second-largest missile manufacturer.

The financial performance and number of employees of Airbus Group SE since 2003. View source data.

On 16 June 2003 EADS acquired BAE's 25 % share in Astrium, the satellite and space system manufacturer, to become the sole owner. EADS paid £84 million, however due to the lossmaking status of the company BAE invested an equal amount for "restructuring". It was subsequently renamed EADS Astrium, and had the divisions Astrium Satellites, Astrium Space Transportation and Astrium Services.

Despite repeated suggestions as early as 2000 that BAE Systems wished to sell its 20 % share of Airbus, the possibility was consistently denied by the company. However, on 6 April 2006 BBC News reported that it was indeed to sell its stake, then "conservatively valued" at £2.4 billion. Due to the slow pace of informal negotiations, BAE exercised its put option, which saw investment bank Rothschild appointed to give an independent valuation. Six days after this process began, Airbus announced delays to the A380 with significant effects on the value of Airbus shares. On 2 June 2006 Rothschild valued BAE's share at £1.87 billion, well below BAE's, analysts' and even EADS' expectations. The BAE board recommended that the company proceed with the sale and on 4 October 2006 shareholders voted in favour; the sale was completed on 13 October making EADS the sole shareholder of Airbus.

In September 2006 the Russian government, through its state-controlled VTB, announced that it had purchased 5% of the EADS float. By August 2013 the VTB stake had been sold to Vnesheconombank (aka VEB.RF), and the Russian share had been reduced to 2.88% because they needed to stanch a financial wound elsewhere in their domestic aircraft industry.

In March 2007, EADS Defence and Security Systems division was awarded an eight-year, £200m contract to provide the IT infrastructure for the FiReControl project in the UK.

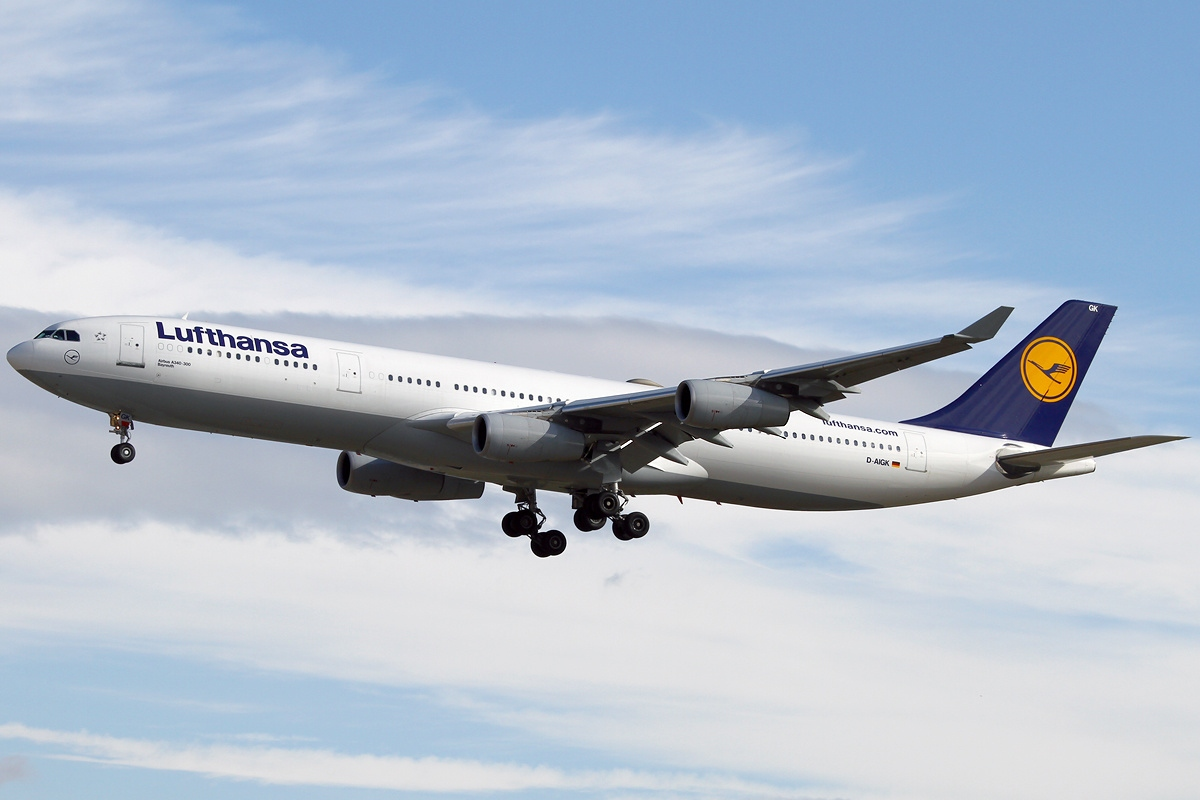
Airbus A340-300 introduced in 1993

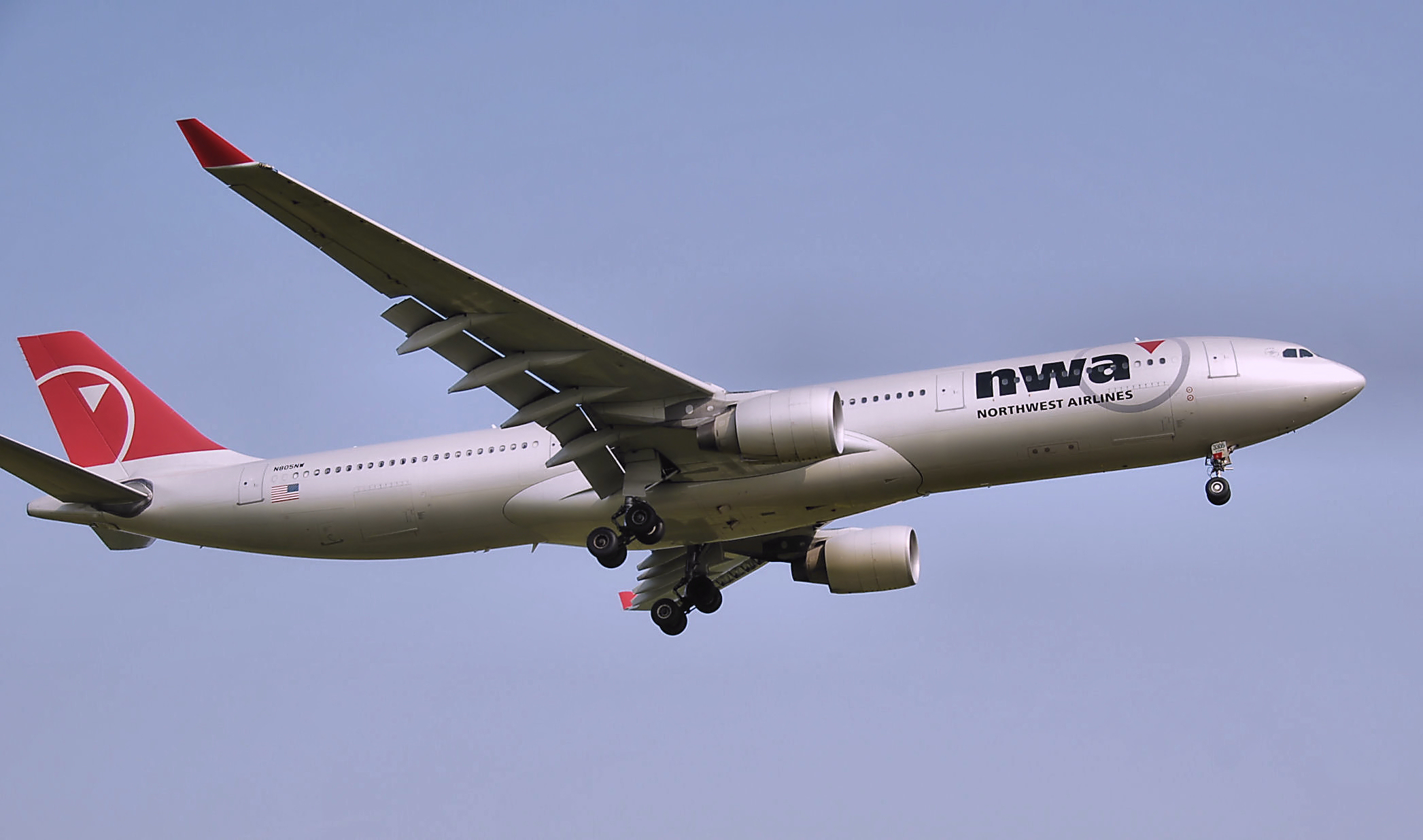
Airbus A330 introduced in 1994

The retention of production and engineering assets by the partner companies in effect made Airbus Industrie a sales and marketing company. This arrangement led to inefficiencies due to the inherent conflicts of interest that the four partner companies faced; they were both shareholders of, and subcontractors to, the consortium. The companies collaborated on development of the Airbus range, but guarded the financial details of their own production activities and sought to maximise the transfer prices of their sub-assemblies.

It was becoming clear that Airbus was no longer a temporary collaboration to produce a single plane as per its original mission statement; it had become a long-term brand for the development of further aircraft. By the late 1980s, work had begun on a pair of new medium-sized aircraft, the biggest to be produced at this point under the Airbus name, the Airbus A330 and the Airbus A340.

In the early 1990s the then Airbus CEO Jean Pierson argued that the GIE should be abandoned and Airbus established as a conventional company. However, the difficulties of integrating and valuing the assets of four companies, as well as legal issues, delayed the initiative. In December 1998, when it was reported that British Aerospace and DASA were close to merging, Aérospatiale paralysed negotiations on the Airbus conversion; the French company feared the combined BAe/DASA, which would own 57.9% of Airbus, would dominate the company and it insisted on a 50/50 split. However, the issue was resolved in January 1999 when BAe abandoned talks with DASA in favour of merging with Marconi Electronic Systems to become BAE Systems. Then in 2000, three of the four partner companies (DaimlerChrysler Aerospace, successor to Deutsche Airbus; Aérospatiale-Matra, successor to Sud-Aviation; and CASA) merged to form EADS, simplifying the process. EADS now owned Airbus France, Airbus Deutschland and Airbus España, and thus 80% of Airbus Industrie. BAE Systems and EADS transferred their production assets to the new company, Airbus SAS, in return for shareholdings in that company.

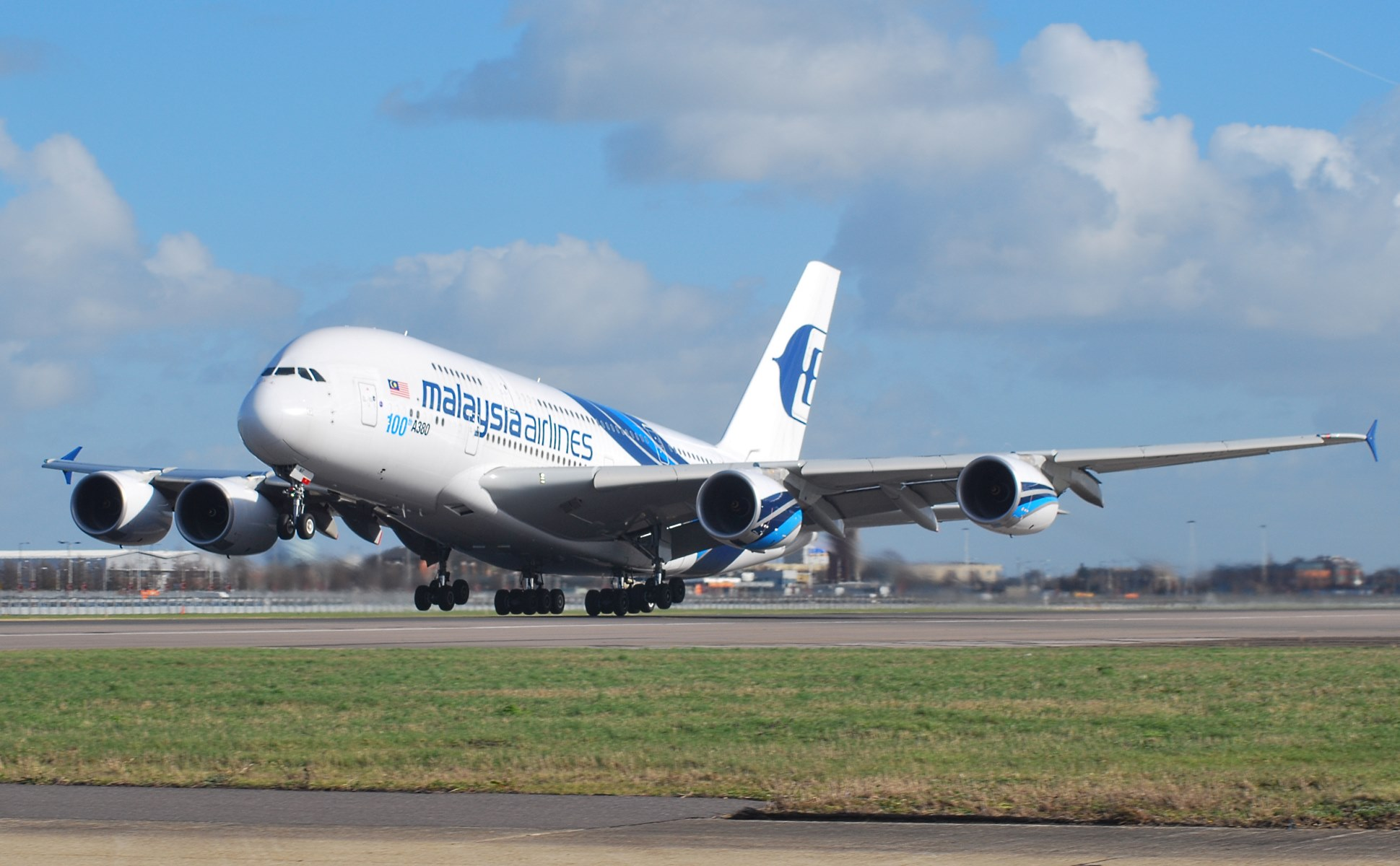
Airbus A380, the largest passenger jet in the world, introduced in 2007.

In mid-1988 a group of Airbus engineers led by Jean Roeder began working in secret on the development of an ultra-high-capacity airliner (UHCA), both to complete its own range of products and to break the dominance that Boeing had enjoyed in this market segment since the early 1970s with its 747. The project was announced at the 1990 Farnborough Air Show, with the stated goal of 15% lower operating costs than the 747-400. Airbus organised four teams of designers, one from each of its partners (Aérospatiale, DaimlerChrysler Aerospace, British Aerospace, CASA) to propose new technologies for its future aircraft designs. In June 1994 Airbus began developing its own very large airliner, then designated as A3XX. Airbus considered several designs, including an odd side-by-side combination of two fuselages from the Airbus A340, which was Airbus's largest jet at the time. Airbus refined its design, targeting a 15% to 20% reduction in operating costs over the existing Boeing 747-400. The A3XX design converged on a double-decker layout that provided more passenger volume than a traditional single-deck design.

Five A380s were built for testing and demonstration purposes. The first A380 was unveiled at a ceremony in Toulouse on 18 January 2005, and its maiden flight took place on 27 April 2005. After successfully landing three hours and 54 minutes later, chief test pilot Jacques Rosay said flying the A380 had been "like handling a bicycle". On 1 December 2005, the A380 achieved its maximum design speed of Mach 0.96. On 10 January 2006, the A380 made its first transatlantic flight to Medellín in Colombia.

The Airbus A380 was delayed in October 2006 due to the use of incompatible software used to design the aircraft. Primarily, the Toulouse assembly plant used the latest version 5 of CATIA (made by Dassault), while the design centre at the Hamburg factory were using the older and incompatible version 4. The result was that the 530 km of cables wiring throughout the aircraft had to be completely redesigned. Although no orders had been cancelled, Airbus still had to pay millions in late-delivery penalties.

The first aircraft delivered was to Singapore Airlines on 15 October 2007 and entered service on 25 October 2007 with an inaugural flight between Singapore and Sydney. Two months later Singapore Airlines CEO Chew Choong Seng said that the A380 was performing better than both the airline and Airbus had anticipated, burning 20% less fuel per passenger than the airline's existing 747-400 fleet. Emirates was the second airline to take delivery of the A380 on 28 July 2008 and started flights between Dubai and New York on 1 August 2008. Qantas followed on 19 September 2008, starting flights between Melbourne and Los Angeles on 20 October 2008.

In 2003, Airbus and the Kaskol Group created an Airbus Engineering centre in Russia, which started with 30 engineers and since has emerged as a model of success for Airbus' globalisation strategy. It was the first engineering facility to open in Europe outside the company's home countries. Equipped with state-of-the-art communications equipment and linked with Airbus engineering sites in France and Germany, the facility performed extensive work in disciplines such as fuselage structure, stress, system installation and design. In 2011, the centre employed some 200 engineers who have completed over 30 large-scale projects for the A320, the A330/A340 and the A380 programmes. Russian engineers also performed more than half of all design work on the A330-200F freighter, with its activity related to fuselage structure design, floor grids installation and junctions design. The centre was involved in the A320neo Sharklets design development and numerous design works for the A350 XWB programme.

On 6 April 2006 BAE Systems announced its intention to sell its 20% share in Airbus, then "conservatively valued" at €3.5 billion (US$4.17 billion). Analysts suggested the decision was to make partnerships with U.S. firms more feasible, in both financial and political terms. BAE originally sought to agree on a price with EADS through an informal process. Due to lengthy negotiations and disagreements over price, BAE exercised its put option, which saw investment bank Rothschild appointed to give an independent valuation.

In June 2006 Airbus was embroiled in controversy over an announcement of further delays in the delivery of its A380. Following the announcement the value of associated stock plunged by up to 25% in a matter of days, although it soon recovered afterwards. Allegations of insider trading on the part of Noël Forgeard, CEO of EADS, its majority corporate parent, promptly followed. The loss of associated value was of grave concern to BAE, press described a "furious row" between BAE and EADS, with BAE believing the announcement was designed to depress the value of its share. A French shareholder group filed a class action lawsuit against EADS for failing to inform investors of the financial implications of the A380 delays while airlines awaiting deliveries demanded compensation. As a result, EADS chief Noël Forgeard and Airbus CEO Gustav Humbert resigned on 2 July 2006.

On 2 July 2006 Rothschild valued BAE's stake at £1.9 billion (€2.75 billion), well below the expectations of BAE, analysts, and even EADS. On 5 July, BAE appointed independent auditors to investigate how the value of its share of Airbus had fallen from the original estimates, however in September 2006 BAE agreed to the sale of its stake in Airbus to EADS for £1.87 billion (€2.75 billion, $3.53 billion), pending BAE shareholder approval. On 4 October shareholders voted in favour of the sale, leaving Airbus entirely owned by EADS.

On 9 October 2006 Christian Streiff, Humbert's successor, resigned due to differences with parent company EADS over the amount of independence he would be granted in implementing his reorganisation plan for Airbus. He was succeeded by EADS co-CEO Louis Gallois, bringing Airbus under more direct control of its parent company.

On 28 February 2007, CEO Louis Gallois announced the company's restructuring plans. Entitled Power^{8}, the plan would see 10,000 jobs cut over four years; 4,300 in France, 3,700 in Germany, 1,600 in the UK and 400 in Spain. 5,000 of the 10,000 would be at subcontractors. Plants at Saint Nazaire, Varel and Laupheim face sell off or closure, while Meaulte, Nordenham and Filton are "open to investors". As of 16 September 2008 the Laupheim plant has been sold to a Thales-Diehl consortium to form Diehl Aerospace and while the design activities at Filton have been retained, the manufacturing operations have been sold to British company GKN. The announcements resulted in Airbus unions in France and Germany threatening strike action.

In February 2008, the United States Air Force awarded a $35 billion contract for KC-45 aerial refueling tankers to Northrop Grumman, with EADS as a major subcontractor. The contract, initially valued at $35 billion, would have seen Northrop Grumman and EADS would build a fleet of 179 planes based on the existing Airbus A330 to provide in-air refueling to military aircraft. Final assembly of the aircraft would take place at an Airbus plant near Mobile, Alabama. However the award was protested by Boeing, the other bidder on the project, which was upheld by the GAO. The competition was restarted and in March 2010, Northrop Grumman announced it was withdrawing its bid, with its CEO stating that the revised tender requirement favored Boeing. On 20 April 2010, EADS announced it was re-entering the competition and intended to enter a bid with the KC-45.

EADS reported a 763 million euros loss for 2009 as a result of a 1.8 billion euros charge on the troubled Airbus A400M project and a 240 million euros charge related to the A380.

At the 2011 Paris Air Show, Airbus received total orders valued at about $72.2 billion for 730 aircraft, a new record in the civil aviation industry. The A320neo ("new engine option") model, announced in December 2010, received 667 orders; this, together with previous orders, resulted in a total of 1029 orders within six months of launch date, creating another industry record.

In September 2012 it was reported that BAE and EADS were in merger discussions. In the event of a merger, BAE shareholders would own 40 % and EADS 60 % of the resultant organisation. EADS shareholder Lagardere asked EADS to rethink the proposed merger as the conditions were unsatisfactory. Executives of BAE Systems and EADS issued a joint statement seeking political support for their proposed 35 billion euro (US$45 billion) merger from the British, French and German governments; they reiterated that the combination is borne out of opportunity, not necessity and the new company would be greater than the sum of its parts. On 10 October 2012, the merger proposal was abandoned.

== 2014–2015: Airbus Group NV ==
In January 2014, EADS was reorganised as Airbus Group NV an Naamloze vennootschap ('public limited company'), with three divisions (Airbus, Airbus Defence and Space, and Airbus Helicopters.

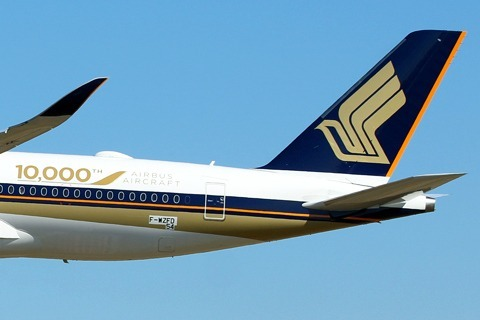
The 10,000th aircraft, an A350, was delivered to Singapore Airlines on 14 October

== 2015–2017: Airbus Group SE ==
On 27 May 2015 the company became a Societas Europaea (SE; Latin for 'European company').

In 2015, Airbus Group announced it was establishing an R&D center and venture capital fund in Silicon Valley. Airbus CEO Fabrice Bregier stated: "What is the weakness of a big group like Airbus when we talk about innovation? We believe that we have better ideas than the rest of the world. We believe that we know because we control the technologies and platforms. The world has shown us in the car industry, the space industry and the hi-tech industry that this is not true. And we need to be open to others' ideas and others' innovations".

Airbus Group CEO Tom Enders stated that "The only way to do it for big companies is really to create spaces outside of the main business where we allow and where we incentivize experimentation ... That is what we have started to do but there is no manual ... It is a little bit of trial and error. We all feel challenged by what the Internet companies are doing."

Six months after launch, the Airbus Group Venture fund in Silicon Valley became fully operational in January 2016.

In January 2016, Airbus announced it has signed a tentative agreement with Iran to sell 118 Airbus aircraft along with a comprehensive civil aviation cooperation package as a part of the implementation of the Joint Comprehensive Plan of Action (JCPOA). Boeing has also announced its will to sell 80 jets directly to Iran Air as part of a proposed deal worth up to $17.6bn.

However, in early July 2016, the US House of Representatives passed amendments that would block US Department of Treasury funds from granting export licences or reexport of passenger commercial aircraft. Boeing reacted by arguing that if its deal with Iran was blocked by the US Congress, all other companies that supply to its rivals should be prohibited as well. Airbus, too, has said that it requires US's approval to export airliners to Iran, because parts of its aircraft are made in the US. The deal between Iran Air and Airbus was finally implemented, and the first new purchased Airbus aircraft, an A321, landed in Tehran's International Mehr Abad Airport on 12 January 2017; Airbus stated that the delivery has been in full compliance with the JCPOA and US government Office of Foreign Assets Control licenses.

In September 2016, Airbus Group announced that it would merge with its largest division, Airbus SAS, into a new entity and introduce a single Airbus brand, with the merge taking effect on 1 January 2017. The group reorganised under the brand name of "Airbus" in January 2017. The subsidiaries Airbus Helicopters and Airbus Defence and Space became operating divisions of the same company.

== 2017–present: Airbus SE ==
Structural evolution of Airbus SE
Dec 1970
Jan 1992
July 2000
Sep 2000
Jan 2001
Dec 2006
Apr 2009
Sep 2010
Jan 2014
May 2015
Jan 2017
Apr 2017

European Aeronautic Defence and Space Company NV
Airbus Group NV
Airbus Group SE
Airbus SE

Airbus Industrie GIE
Airbus SAS

Airbus Military SAS
Airbus Defence and Space SAS

EADS Defence and Security
Cassidian SAS

Astrium SAS
EADS Astrium SAS

Eurocopter SA
Eurocopter SAS
Airbus Helicopters SAS

Airbus Group SE changed its legal name to Airbus SE at its 2017 annual meeting on 12 April 2017.

On 30 June, Airbus said its airliner sales team would now report directly to Tom Enders, Airbus Chief Executive, and by-pass Fabrice Bregier, who will lead programs, support and services, engineering, manufacturing, procurement and quality while Enders will lead sales and marketing.

On 16 October, Airbus and Bombardier Aerospace announced a partnership on the CSeries program, with Airbus acquiring a 50.01% majority stake, to expand in an estimated market of more than 6,000 new 100-150 seat aircraft over 20 years; Airbus' supply chain expertise should save production costs but headquarters and assembly remain in Québec while U.S. customers would benefit from a second Final Assembly Line in Mobile, Alabama.

In the fall, Der Spiegel investigated systematic corruption and improper intermediates usage in past sales and questioned whether Enders can survive the scandal as he did not react quickly enough, then Handelsblatt reported the French government wants to control Airbus again and Bregier wants to get Enders fired to gain his position.

Sales chief John Leahy was supposed to retire at the end of 2017 to be replaced by his deputy Kiran Rao. A few weeks before the switch, Rao told Airbus CEO Tom Enders that he was no longer available. This should have been disclosed in early 2018, however the media hype accelerated the timing but not the decision.

For 2017, Airbus announced it received 1,109 net orders from 44 customers in 2017, and delivered 718 aircraft to 85 customers: 558 A320 Family (including 181 A320neo); 67 A330s; 78 A350 XWBs and 15 A380s.

Following the UK decision to leave the EU, Airbus faced calls to move or reduce wing production from the UK. Currently produced in Broughton and designed in Filton since 1970, wing production employs 15,000 people, which is over 10% of Airbus staff. However Tom Enders promised the UK government that Airbus would retain its British operations "long into the future" and see the UK as a "home country and a competitive place to invest". Airbus will designate a new CEO to succeed Enders by the end of 2018, which will be submitted to shareholders at the spring 2019 annual meeting, with planemaking boss and former Eurocopter head Guillaume Faury as the main internal candidate. Airbus chief financial officer Harald Wilhelm will quit when Enders will leave in 2019.

On 15 May, in its EU appeal ruling, the WTO concluded that the A350 and A380 received improper subsidies through repayable launch aids or low interest rates which could have been avoided, and Airbus agreed to correct those violations.

On 13 September, Eric Schulz left the Chief Commercial Officer role for personal reasons and was replaced by Christian Scherer, CEO of ATR since October 2016. As Schulz was previously head of Rolls-Royce plc civil engines, currently suffering problems, airlines could have had a skewed opinion.

On 8 October, the Board of directors selected Guillaume Faury to succeed Tom Enders as Airbus CEO from 10 April 2019. On 21 November, Airbus appointed Michael Schöllhorn, COO for BSH Home Appliances GmbH, to succeed Tom Williams as Chief Operating Officer (COO) for Airbus Commercial Aircraft from 1 February 2019, and Dominik Asam, CFO of Infineon Technologies, to succeed Harald Wilhelm as Chief Financial Officer from 10 April 2019. On 20 December 2018, Le Monde newspaper reported the U.S. Department of Justice had opened a corruption investigation, which could result in fines of up to 4-5 billion Euros.

In February 2019, Airbus launched The OneAtlas Platform, a geospatial tool that applies artificial intelligence to satellite images and extracts insights for customers.

In April 2024, Airbus revealed that C. Jeffrey Knittel would step down from his position as chairman and CEO of Airbus Americas, with his retirement set for 3 June. Robin Hayes, previously the CEO of JetBlue Airways, had been selected as his successor.

== Competition with Boeing ==
Annual net orders and aircraft deliveries by Airbus and Boeing Commercial Airplanes, respectively, since 1989. View source data.

Airbus is in tight competition with Boeing every year for aircraft orders although Airbus has secured over 50% of aircraft orders in the decade since 2003.

Airbus won a greater share of orders in 2003 and 2004. In 2005, Airbus achieved 1111 (1055 net) orders, compared to 1029 (net of 1002) for the same year at rival Boeing However, Boeing won 55% of 2005 orders proportioned by value; and in the following year Boeing won more orders by both measures. Airbus in 2006 achieved its second best year ever in its entire 35-year history in terms of the number of orders it received, 824, second only to the previous year. Airbus plans to increase production of A320 airliners to reach 40 per month by 2012, at a time when Boeing is increasing monthly 737 production from 31.5 to 35 per month.

Regarding operational aircraft, there were 7,264 Airbus aircraft operational at April 2013. Although Airbus secured over 50% of aircraft orders in the decade since 2003, the number of Boeing aircraft still in operation at April 2013 still exceeded Airbus by 21% because Airbus made a late entry into the market, 1972 vs. 1958 for Boeing; this lead is diminishing as older aircraft are progressively retired.

Though both manufacturers have a broad product range in various segments from single-aisle to wide-body, their aircraft do not always compete head-to-head. Instead they respond with models slightly smaller or bigger than the other in order to plug any holes in demand and achieve a better edge. The A380, for example, is designed to be larger than the 747. The A350XWB competes with the high end of the 787 and the low end of the 777. The A320 is bigger than the 737-700 but smaller than the 737-800. The A321 is bigger than the 737-900 but smaller than the previous 757-200. Airlines see this as a benefit since they get a more complete product range, from 100 seats to 500 seats, than if both companies offered identical aircraft.

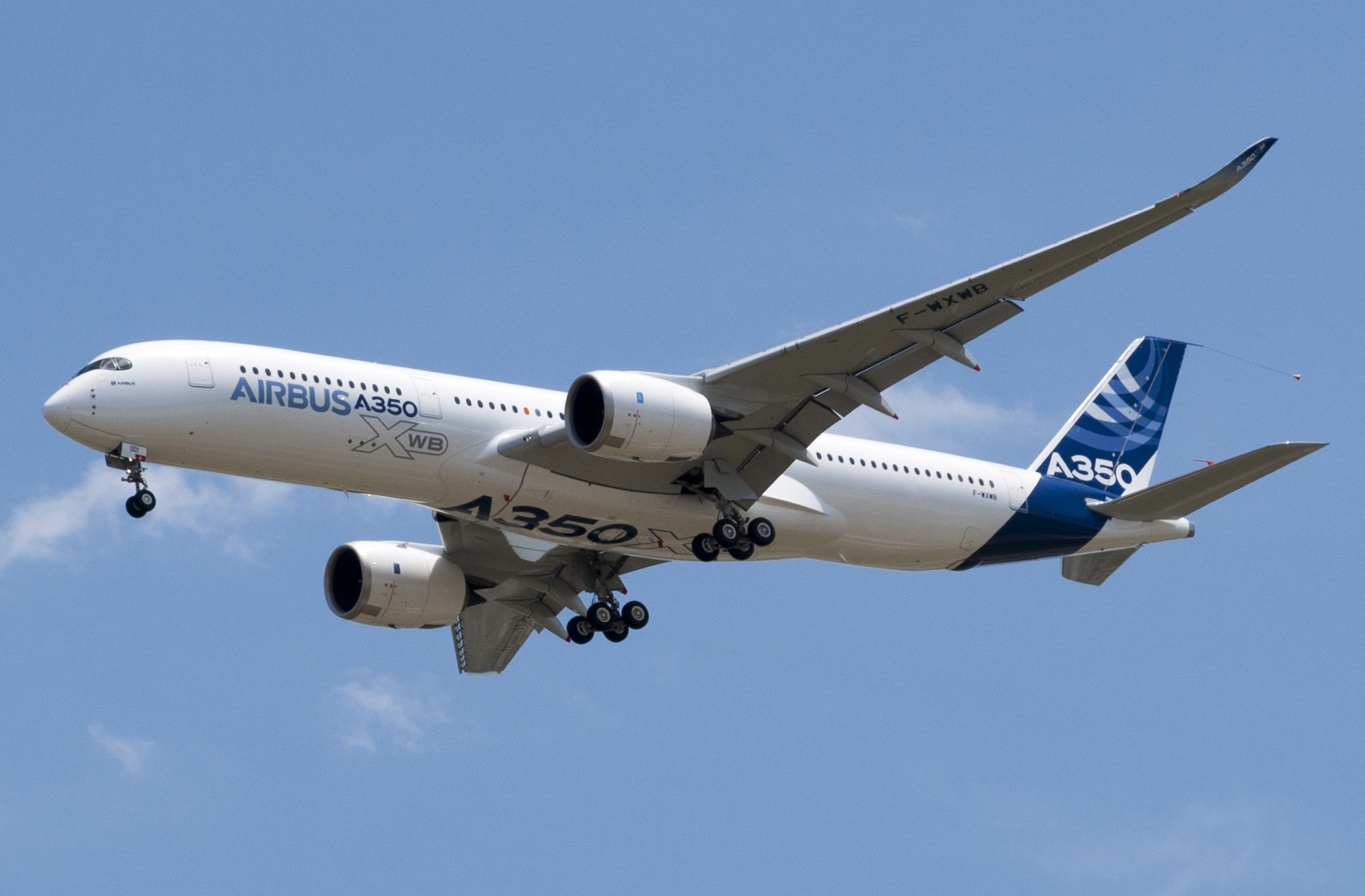
The first Airbus A350 XWB on its maiden flight.

In recent years the Boeing 777 has outsold its Airbus counterparts, which include the A340 family as well as the A330-300. The smaller A330-200 competes with the 767, outselling its Boeing counterpart in recent years. The A380 is anticipated to further reduce sales of the Boeing 747, gaining Airbus a share of the market in very large aircraft, though frequent delays in the A380 programme have caused several customers to consider the refreshed 747–8. Airbus has also proposed the A350 XWB to compete with the Boeing 787 Dreamliner, after being under great pressure from airlines to produce a competing model.

The A320neo's primary competitor is the Boeing 737 MAX, which was grounded from March 2019 to November 2020 after two fatal accidents.

== Timeline ==
Structural evolution of Airbus SE
Dec 1970
Jan 1992
July 2000
Sep 2000
Jan 2001
Dec 2006
Apr 2009
Sep 2010
Jan 2014
May 2015
Jan 2017
Apr 2017

European Aeronautic Defence and Space Company NV
Airbus Group NV
Airbus Group SE
Airbus SE

Airbus Industrie GIE
Airbus SAS

Airbus Military SAS
Airbus Defence and Space SAS

EADS Defence and Security
Cassidian SAS

Astrium SAS
EADS Astrium SAS

Eurocopter SA
Eurocopter SAS
Airbus Helicopters SAS

== Branding ==
The logos of Airbus Industrie GIE and Airbus SAS displayed a stylised turbine symbol, redolent of a jet engine, and a font similar to Helvetica Black. The logo colours were reflected in the standard Airbus aircraft livery in each period. The EADS logo, from 2000 to 2010, combined the logos of the merged companies, DaimlerChrysler Aerospace AG (a four-ray star) and Aérospatiale-Matra (a curved arrow), after which these elements were removed and a new font with 3D shading was chosen. This font was retained in the logos of Airbus Group NV (2014–2015) and Airbus Group SE (2015–2017), then Airbus SE:

Original, for Airbus A300

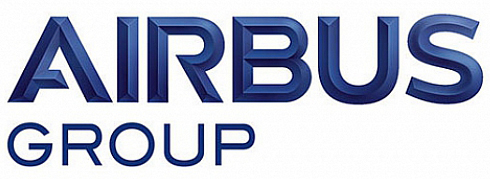
2014–2017

2017–present

== See also ==
- Competition between Airbus and Boeing
- Concorde aircraft histories
- History of aviation
  - Aviation in the Digital Age
