= 2015 Bilderberg Conference =

Europe–North America forum in Austria

The 2015 Bilderberg Conference took place between 11 and 14 June 2015 at the Interalpen-Hotel Tyrol in Telfs-Buchen, Austria. The hotel had previously held the Bilderberg Conference in 1988.

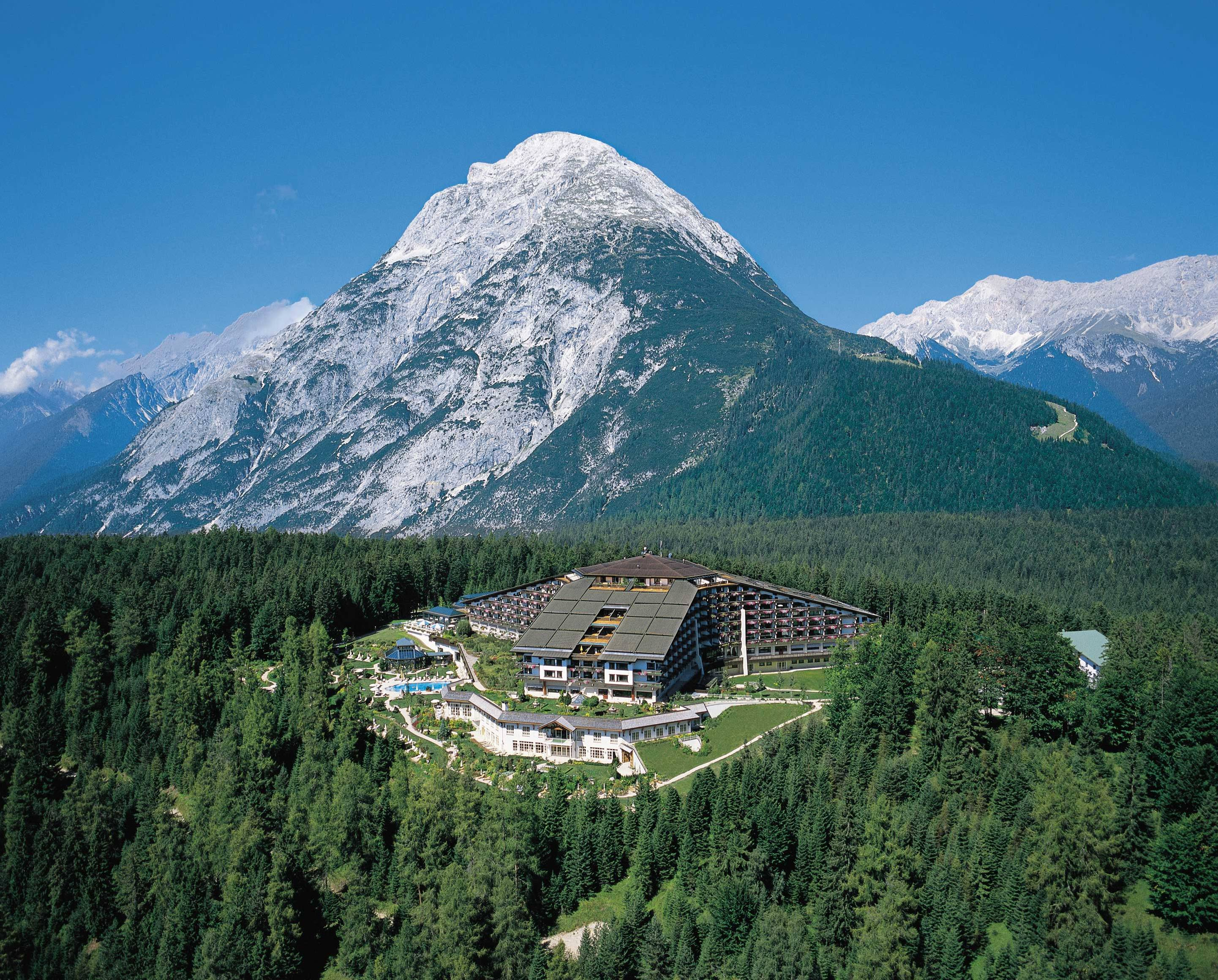
Interalpen Hotel-Tyrol, held in 1988 and 2015

The 41st G7 summit took place the week before the conference, and was held at the Schloss Elmau, sixteen miles away near Garmisch-Partenkirchen, in Bavaria, Germany.

== Agenda ==
A list of key topics for discussion at the 2015 Bilderberg conference was published on the Bilderberg website shortly before the meeting. Topics for discussion included:

- Artificial intelligence
- Cybersecurity
- Chemical weapons threats
- Current economic issues
- European strategy
- Globalisation
- Greece
- Iran
- Middle East
- NATO
- Russia
- Terrorism
- United Kingdom
- USA
- US elections

== Delegates (alphabetical) ==
A list of expected delegates was published by the Bilderberg Group. Also included are positions of note at the time of the meeting (2015).

- Paul Achleitner, former chairman of Deutsche Bank's supervisory board
- Marcus Agius, non-executive chairman, PA Consulting Group
- Thomas Ahrenkiel, director of the Danish Intelligence Service (DDIS)
- John R. Allen, special presidential envoy for the Global Coalition to Counter ISIL, United States Department of State (in 2015)
- Roger Altman, executive chairman, Evercore Partners
- Anne Applebaum, director of Transitions Forum, Legatum Institute in 2015
- Matti Apunen, director, Finnish Business and Policy Forum
- Zoë Baird, CEO and president, Markle Foundation
- Ed Balls, former Shadow Chancellor of the Exchequer (in 2015)
- Francisco Pinto Balsemão, chairman, Impresa SGPS
- José Manuel Barroso, former President of the European Commission
- Nicolas Baverez, partner, Gibson, Dunn & Crutcher
- René Benko, founder, Signa Holding
- Franco Bernabè, chairman, FB Group
- Ben van Beurden, CEO, Royal Dutch Shell in 2015
- Laurent Bigorgne, director, Institut Montaigne
- Laurence Boone, special adviser on financial and economic affairs to the president in 2015
- Ana Patricia Botín, chairman, Banco Santander in 2015
- Svein Richard Brandtzaeg, president and CEO, Norsk Hydro
- Oscar Bronner, founder and, as of 2015, publisher of Der Standard
- William J. Burns, president, Carnegie Endowment for International Peace in 2015
- Patrick Calvar, director general, DGSI in 2015
- Henri de Castries, chairman, Bilderberg Meetings; chairman and CEO, Axa Group in 2015
- Juan Luis Cebrián, executive chairman, PRISA in 2015
- W. Edmund Clark, retired executive, TD Bank Group
- Benoît Coeuré, member of the executive board, European Central Bank in 2015
- Andrew Coyne, editor, editorials and comment, National Post
- Mikael L. Damberg, minister for enterprise and innovation
- Karel De Gucht, former EU trade commissioner, state minister
- Thomas E. Donilon, former U.S. national security advisor; partner and vice chair, O'Melveny & Myers LLP
- Mathias Döpfner, CEO, Axel Springer SE
- Ann Dowling, president, Royal Academy of Engineering
- Regina Dugan, vice president for engineering, advanced technology and projects at Google, in 2015
- Trine Eilertsen, political editor, Aftenposten
- Merete Eldrup, CEO, TV 2 Danmark A/S
- John Elkann, chairman and CEO, EXOR; chairman, Fiat Chrysler Automobiles
- Tom Enders, CEO, Airbus Group in 2015
- Mary Erdoes, CEO, JP Morgan Asset Management
- Rona Fairhead, chairman, BBC Trust
- Ulrik Federspiel, executive vice president, Haldor Topsøe A/S
- Martin Feldstein, president emeritus, NBER; professor of economics, Harvard University
- Heinz Fischer, federal president
- Douglas Flint, group chairman, HSBC Holdings plc
- Christoph Franz, chairman of the board, F. Hoffmann-La Roche Ltd
- Louise Fresco, president and chairman of executive board, Wageningen University and Research Centre
- Kenneth C. Griffin, founder and CEO, Citadel Investment Group, LLC
- Lilli Gruber, executive editor and anchor Otto e mezzo, La7 TV
- Sergei Guriev, professor of economics, Sciences Po
- Gönenç Gürkaynak, managing partner, ELIG Law Firm
- Alfred Gusenbauer, former chancellor of the Republic of Austria
- Victor Halberstadt, professor of economics, Leiden University
- Erich Hampel, chairman, UniCredit Bank Austria AG
- Demis Hassabis, vice president of engineering, Google DeepMind
- Wolfgang Hesoun, CEO, Siemens Austria
- Philipp Hildebrand, vice chairman, BlackRock Inc.
- Reid Hoffman, co-founder and executive chairman, LinkedIn
- Wolfgang Ischinger, chairman, Munich Security Conference
- Kenneth M. Jacobs, chairman and CEO, Lazard, in 2015
- Julia Jäkel, CEO, Gruner + Jahr
- James A. Johnson, chairman, Johnson Capital Partners
- Alain Juppé, mayor of Bordeaux, former prime minister
- Joe Kaeser, president and CEO, Siemens AG
- Alex Karp, CEO, Palantir Technologies
- Gilles Kepel, university professor, Sciences Po
- John Kerr, deputy chairman, Scottish Power
- Ilhan Kesici, MP, Turkish Parliament
- Henry Kissinger, chairman, Kissinger Associates, Inc.
- Klaus Kleinfeld, chairman and CEO, Alcoa
- Klaas Knot, president, De Nederlandsche Bank
- Mustafa Vehbi Koç, chairman, Koç Holding A.S.
- Henry Kravis, co-chairman and Co-CEO, Kohlberg Kravis Roberts & Co.
- Marie-Josée Kravis, senior fellow and vice chair, Hudson Institute
- André Kudelski, chairman and CEO, Kudelski Group
- Kurt Lauk, president, Globe Capital Partners
- Carola Lemne, CEO, The Confederation of Swedish Enterprise
- Stuart Levey, chief legal officer, HSBC Holdings plc in 2015
- Ursula von der Leyen, minister of defence
- Thomas Leysen, chairman of the board of directors, KBC Group
- Shiraz Maher, senior research fellow, ICSR, King's College London
- Christina Markus Lassen, head of department, Ministry of Foreign Affairs, Security Policy and Stabilisation
- Jessica Mathews, president and Distinguished Fellow, Carnegie Endowment for International Peace in 2015
- James Mattis, Distinguished Visiting Fellow, Hoover Institution, Stanford University
- Pierre Maudet, vice-president of the State Council, Department of Security, Police and the Economy of Geneva
- David I. McKay, president and CEO, Royal Bank of Canada
- Nuray Mert, columnist, professor of political science, Istanbul University
- Jim Messina, CEO, The Messina Group
- Charles Michel, prime minister
- John Micklethwait, editor-in-chief, Bloomberg LP
- Zanny Minton Beddoes, editor-in-chief, The Economist
- Mario Monti, senator-for-life; president, Bocconi University
- Leena Mörttinen, executive director, The Finnish Family Firms Association
- Craig Mundie, principal, Mundie & Associates, former advisor to CEO of Microsoft (in 2014)
- Heather Munroe-Blum, chairperson, Canada Pension Plan Investment Board
- Beatrix of the Netherlands
- Michael O'Leary, CEO, Ryanair Plc
- George Osborne, First Secretary of State and Chancellor of the Exchequer
- Soli Özel, columnist, Haberturk Newspaper; senior lecturer, Kadir Has University
- Dimitri Papalexopoulos, group CEO, Titan Cement Co.
- Catherine Pégard, president, Public Establishment of the Palace, Museum and National Estate of Versailles
- Richard Perle, resident fellow, American Enterprise Institute
- David Petraeus, chairman, KKR Global Institute
- Panagiotis Pikrammenos, honorary president of The Hellenic Council of State
- Heather Reisman, chair and CEO, Indigo Books & Music Inc.
- Gianfelice Rocca, chairman, Techint Group
- Gerhard Roiss, CEO, OMV Austria
- Robert Rubin, co chair, Council on Foreign Relations; former secretary of the Treasury
- Mark Rutte, prime minister
- Karim Sadjadpour, senior associate, Carnegie Endowment for International Peace
- John Sawers, chairman and partner, Macro Advisory Partners
- Selin Sayek Böke, vice president, Republican People's Party
- Eric Schmidt, executive chairman, Google Inc.
- Rudolf Scholten, CEO, Oesterreichische Kontrollbank
- Karl Sevelda, CEO, Raiffeisen Bank International AG
- Jens Stoltenberg, secretary general, NATO
- Alexander Stubb, minister of finance
- Katrin Suder, deputy minister of defense
- Peter Sutherland, UN special representative; chairman, Goldman Sachs International
- Carl-Henric Svanberg, chairman, BP plc; chairman, AB Volvo
- Olaug Svarva, CEO, The Government Pension Fund Norway
- Peter Thiel, president, Thiel Capital
- Loukas Tsoukalis, president, Hellenic Foundation for European and Foreign Policy
- Ahmet Üzümcü, director-general, Organisation for the Prohibition of Chemical Weapons
- António M. Vitorino, partner, Cuetrecasas, Concalves Pereira, RL
- Jacob Wallenberg, chairman, Investor AB
- Vin Weber, partner, Mercury LLC
- Martin H. Wolf, chief economics commentator, The Financial Times
- James Wolfensohn, chairman and CEO, Wolfensohn and Company
- Robert Zoellick, chairman, board of international advisors, The Goldman Sachs Group
