= Laurence Boone =

French economist

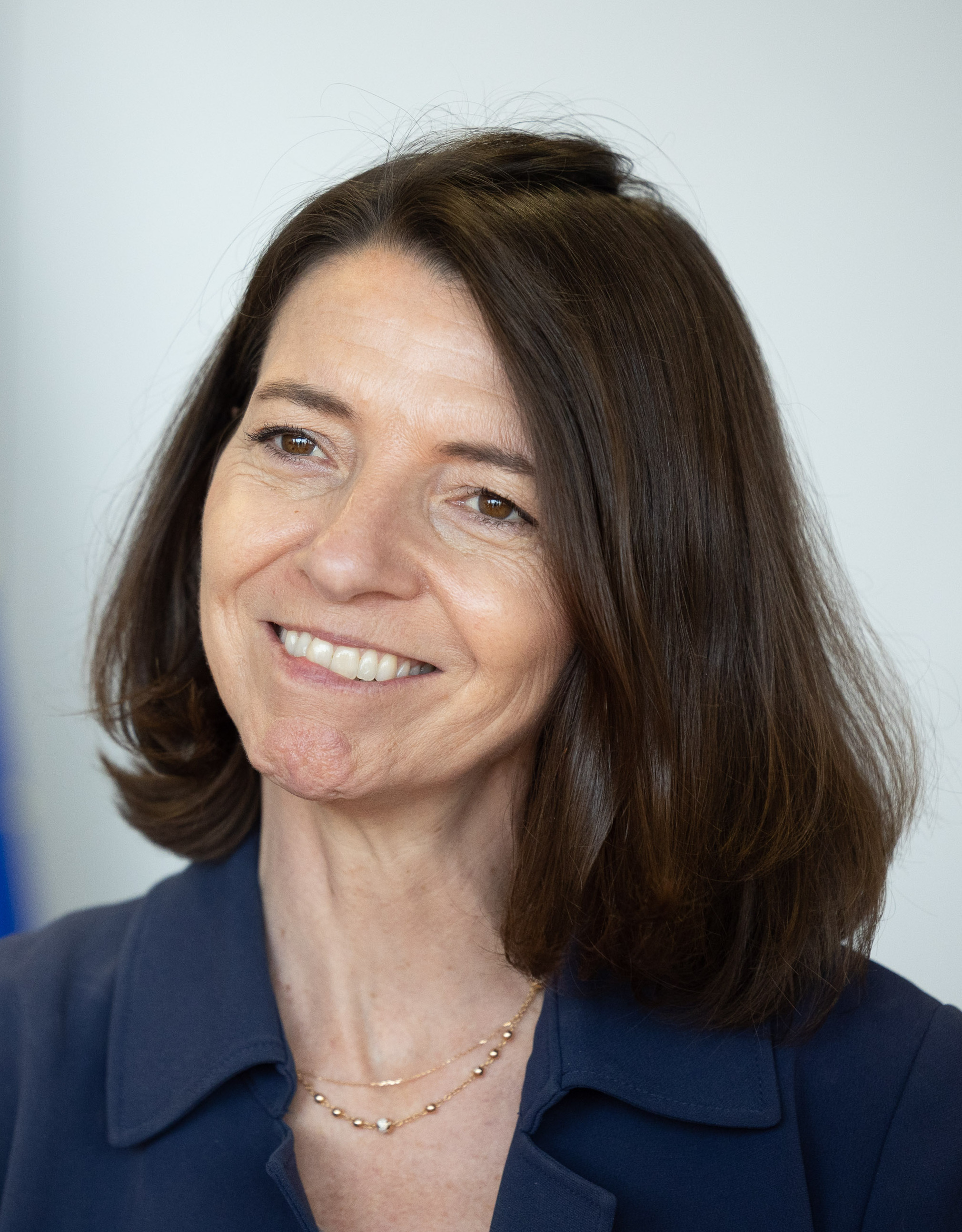
- Boone in 2023

Secretary of State for European Affairs
- In office 26 July 2022 – 11 January 2024
- Prime Minister: Élisabeth Borne
- Preceded by: Clément Beaune
- Succeeded by: Jean-Noël Barrot

Chief Economist of the Organisation for Economic Co-operation and Development
- In office 24 July 2018 – 23 July 2022
- Preceded by: Catherine L. Mann
- Succeeded by: Clare Lombardelli

Personal details
- Born: 15 May 1969 (age 57) Boulogne-Billancourt, France
- Spouse: Xavier Faure
- Children: 2
- Education: Paris Nanterre University (MAS); London Business School (PhD); University of Reading (MSc)

Laurence Boone (born 15 May 1969) is a French economist who served as the Secretary of State for European affairs in the administration of Prime Minister Élisabeth Borne from 2022 to 2024.

Boone’s fields of interest include macroeconomics, European politics and public finance. She served as an economic advisor to President François Hollande between July 2014 and March 2016.

== Early life and education ==
Boone was born in 1969 in a family with distant Irish origins. Her father was an engineer. She attended the school institutions of Notre-Dame-de-Sion, La Bruyère-Sainte-Cécile and École du Sacré-Cœur.

Boone earned an MAS in modelization and quantitative analysis from Paris X-Nanterre University, a PhD in economics from London Business School, and a master's degree in econometrics from the University of Reading.

== Career ==
=== Early beginnings ===
Boone started her career as an analyst at Merrill Lynch Asset Management (1995–6). She was a researcher at the Centre d'Etudes Prospectives et d'Informations Internationales (CEPII) from 1996 to 1998, then an economist at the department of Economic Affairs of the OECD from 1998 to 2004. In 2004, she joined Barclays Capital France as a chief economist.

In 2011, Boone became the Europe chief economist at Bank of America-Merrill Lynch. A member of the Cercle des économistes, Boone authored numerous books and publications. She taught at Sciences Po, École Polytechnique, ENSAE and ENS Cachan. She was also a member of the jury of the École nationale d'administration competitive exam.

In 2014, Boone started editing chronicles for the L'Opinion daily.

=== Career in politics ===
In July 2014, Boone was appointed a financial and economic advisor to the Élysée Palace. The announcement of her nomination to President François Hollande was made in early June 2014 as an anticipation of Emmanuel Macron's resignation. L'Opinion then highlighted one of her recent chronicles in which she criticized "disastrous economic results" and the government's "almost nonexistent choices of economic policy". The announcement of her nomination also sparked harsh comments, like the one of Slate's Éric Dupin: "the world of finance that governs without ever having been elected" —which is a reference to François Hollande's 22 January 2012 speech in Le Bourget. Minister of Finance and the Public Accounts Michel Sapin replied: "Competences are back." The coincidence of the nomination and David Azéma being hired by Bank of America in July 2014 sparked comments about a "shameless revolving door between Bank of America and the socialist power" (Laurent Mauduit).

On 26 December 2014 Boone's position was named "special advisor for multilateral and European economic and financial affairs", sherpa of François Hollande, as a part of a series of decisions made to "simplify" his cabinet. During the Greek government-debt crisis, she contributed to convince the French President to keep Greece in the Eurozone. She was also considered one of the most prominent European economists advocating for a serious democratic overhaul of the eurozone institutions.

Boone took part in the 2015 Bilderberg Conference.

=== Return to the private sector ===
Boone's resignation on 14 March 2016 to join AXA as a chief economist was announced in January of the same year. In this capacity, she worked under the leadership of the company's CEO Thomas Buberl.

=== OECD ===
On 5 June 2018 Boone was appointed as chief economist of the OECD, as a replacement to Catherine L. Mann. She took office on 24 July 2018, working under the leadership of secretary general José Ángel Gurría.

In June 2021, Boone was also appointed to the World Bank–International Monetary Fund High-Level Advisory Group (HLAG) on Sustainable and Inclusive Recovery and Growth, co-chaired by Mari Pangestu, Ceyla Pazarbasioglu, and Nicholas Stern.

In January 2022, Boone was appointed as Deputy Secretary-General of the OECD, serving alongside Kerri-Ann Jones and Ulrik Knudsen under secretary general Mathias Cormann.

== Other activities ==
=== Corporate boards ===
- Kering, Member of the Board of Directors (2010–2014)

=== Non-profit organizations ===
- European Council on Foreign Relations (ECFR), Member of the Council
- Jacques Delors Centre, Hertie School, Member of the Advisory Board
- Cercle des économistes, Member

== Personal life ==
Boone is married to Polytechnician Xavier Faure, and mother of two children.
