= Forgeard =

Forgeard is a surname. Notable people with the surname include:

- Kyle Forgeard, Canadian YouTuber
- Noël Forgeard (born 1946), French industrialist
