= Tom Enders =

German business executive (born 1958)

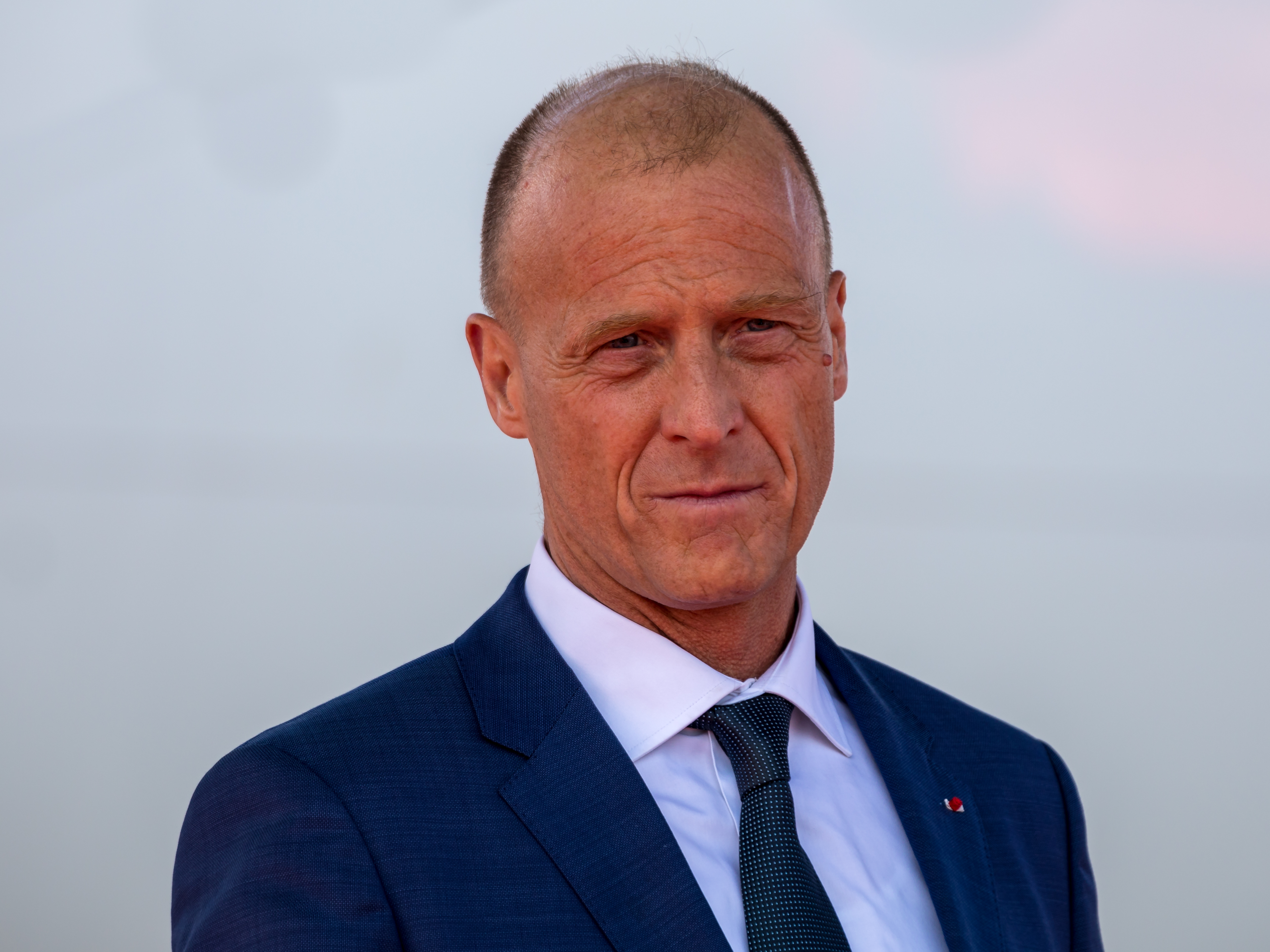
- Enders in 2018
- Born: December 21, 1958 (age 67); Neuschlade, West Germany
- Education: University of Bonn; University of California, Los Angeles

Thomas Enders (born December 21, 1958) is a German business executive who served as the chief executive of Airbus (formerly EADS, Airbus Group) from 2012 until 2019. Since 2019, Thomas has been the president of the German Council on Foreign Relations (DGAP).

== Early life and education ==
Enders was born on December 21, 1958, in Neuschlade, Germany. The son of a shepherd, Enders studied economics, politics, and history at the University of Bonn and the University of California, Los Angeles. He completed his doctorate in political science at the age of 28 on a scholarship of Konrad Adenauer Foundation.

== Career ==
Enders started out his career with early work experience as an assistant at the German Parliament. In 1988, he worked as a researcher at the German Council on Foreign Relations (DGAP) in Bonn and at the International Institute for Strategic Studies (IISS) in London. Enders also serves as a Major in the German Army Reserve, and spent two years in the planning staff of the Federal Ministry of Defence from 1989 until 1991.

Enders joined the marketing department of DaimlerChrysler Aerospace in 1991 and held several functions at DASA until he was promoted to head the defence and security systems business in the frame of the merger of EADS in 2000. In 2005, he was appointed co-CEO (first with co-CEO Noël Forgeard, then Louis Gallois), a role he relinquished in 2007 when the company modified its corporate governance, giving away with double-CEO and double-Chairman structures. As a result of the governance change, Enders was appointed CEO of Airbus SAS, the Group's largest Division. As CEO of the commercial aircraft division, he was responsible for the A320neo launch in 2010, a sales success that forced Boeing to launch the 737 MAX.

In May 2012, the Annual General Meeting of Shareholders approved Enders' nomination to become CEO of EADS. Shortly after his nomination, Enders embarked on a plan to merge with UK-based BAE Systems, which would have created the world's leading defence company. However, the merger plan – the only remaining realistic opportunity to fulfill the company's Vision2020 strategy – failed ultimately due to political intervention. He merged successfully the group with the commercial aircraft division and also took control of the CSeries. In late 2012, EADS and its shareholders – namely Daimler AG, Lagardère Group and the French state – agreed to revamp the company's corporate governance, thereby considerably reducing political influence in the Group. Although Germany, France and Spain are shareholders of the group, none hold any special blocking rights, meaning the company is governed solely by the Board of Directors and the Executive Management. After the failure of the merger with BAE Systems, Enders initiated a review of the company's strategy, which was completed in July 2013. Among others, the outcome resulted in the rebranding of the Group from EADS to Airbus Group in January 2014.

In early 2017, Enders announced his intention to renew his three-year mandate in 2019. On 15 December 2017, the Airbus board – under the leadership of chairman Denis Ranque – confirmed Enders would not stay beyond April 2019 amid corruption allegations in sales campaigns. By the end of his time at Airbus, Enders was widely credited with unifying a company previously divided along national lines, as well as simplifying its governance to reduce political influence.

In January 2021, Enders joined the advisory board of the aerospace start-up Lilium. As announced in June 2021, he will serve as Chairman of the Board following the planned business combination with Qell.

=== Role in politics ===
During his time in office, Enders clashed with the government of Chancellor Angela Merkel over industrial or defense policy and resigned from the conservative CSU party over Germany's opposition to the 2011 military intervention in Libya. He frequently accompanied Merkel on state visits abroad. In Germany, he served as chairman of the German Aerospace Industries Association (BDLI) from 2005 to 2012 and in the presidium of the Federation of German Industries (BDI).

Under the premiership of David Cameron, Enders was appointed to the Prime Minister of the United Kingdom's Business and Advisory Group in his capacity as chief executive of Airbus and later as chief executive of EADS. Between 2010 and 2011, he served on the High-Level Group on Aviation and Aeronautics Research launched by European Commissioners Siim Kallas and Máire Geoghegan-Quinn. Since 2015, he has been serving as a member of the European Commission's High-level Group of Personalities on Defence Research chaired by Elżbieta Bieńkowska.

=== Controversy ===
During his time at Airbus, Enders grappled with scrutiny over the company's sales practices after it uncovered inaccuracies in its filings to U.S. regulators over arms technology sales. He also faced criticism in French media and inside parts of the aerospace group for overseeing sweeping compliance probes that led to dozens of senior departures without specific allegations.

In 2017, Enders became one of more than a dozen people being formally investigated by Austria's public prosecutor as part of a long-running probe into alleged fraud over a €2 billion deal for 18 Eurofighter combat jets. In remarks aimed at Defense Minister Hans Peter Doskozil, he called the claims "cheap election rhetoric," and announced that "we will not let part of the Austrian government use us as a punching bag that it can beat to score cheap political points".

Later that year, French anti-corruption investigators questioned Enders and other company executives as witnesses in an investigation centered on the sale of Astrium satellites to Kazakhstan in 2010.

== Other activities ==
=== Government agencies ===
- Economic Development Board (EDB), Member of the International Advisory Council

=== Corporate boards ===
- KNDS, Chair of the Board of Directors (since 2025)
- Helsing, Member of the Supervisory Board (since 2022)
- Lilium, Member of the Supervisory Board (since 2021)
- Linde, Deputy Chairman of the Supervisory Board (since 2017)
- HSBC Trinkaus & Burkhardt, Member of the Advisory Board (since 2012)
- Lufthansa, Member of the Supervisory Board (2020–2025)
- Knorr-Bremse, Member of the Supervisory Board (2020–2022)
- Carl Zeiss Optronics, Chairman of the Supervisory Board (until 2012)

=== Non-profit organizations ===
- AmCham Germany, Member of the Board of Directors
- AeroSpace and Defence Industries Association of Europe, Member of the Board
- Atlantik-Brücke, Member and former Chairman (2005-2009)
- Atlantic Council, Member of the International Advisory Board
- Berlin Bosphorus Initiative (BBI), Member of the Advisory Board
- Bilderberg Group, Member of the Steering Committee
- German Council on Foreign Relations (DGAP), Member of the Steering Committee
- Deutsches Museum, Member of the Board of Trustees
- International Institute for Strategic Studies (IISS), Member of the Advisory Council
- Max Planck Society, Member of the Senate (since 2014)
- Munich Security Conference, Member of the Advisory Council (since 2014)
- Federation of German Industries (BDI), Member of the Presidium (2009-2019)

== Recognition ==
- 2014 – European Manager of the Year
- 2015 – Legion of Honour
- 2017 – Aviation Week's Person of the Year
- 2019 – Tony Jannus Award for distinguished achievement in commercial air transportation.
- 2019 – Aviation Week & Space Technology 2019 Philip J. Klass Award for Lifetime Achievement (co-winner)

== Personal life ==
Enders was married to Friederike, an economist. The couple has four sons and lived on a farm in Gmund am Tegernsee. In 2025, Enders announced that he was divorced after 35 years of marriage and was in a new relationship.

Enders has a helicopter pilot's license and is a fan of skydiving. In November 2010, he performed a paradrop from the Airbus A400M Atlas.

== See also ==
- Fabrice Brégier
- Louis Gallois

Business positions
| Preceded by Louis Gallois | CEO of Airbus; 2012–2019 | Succeeded by Guillaume Faury |
