= Fabrice Brégier =

French business executive

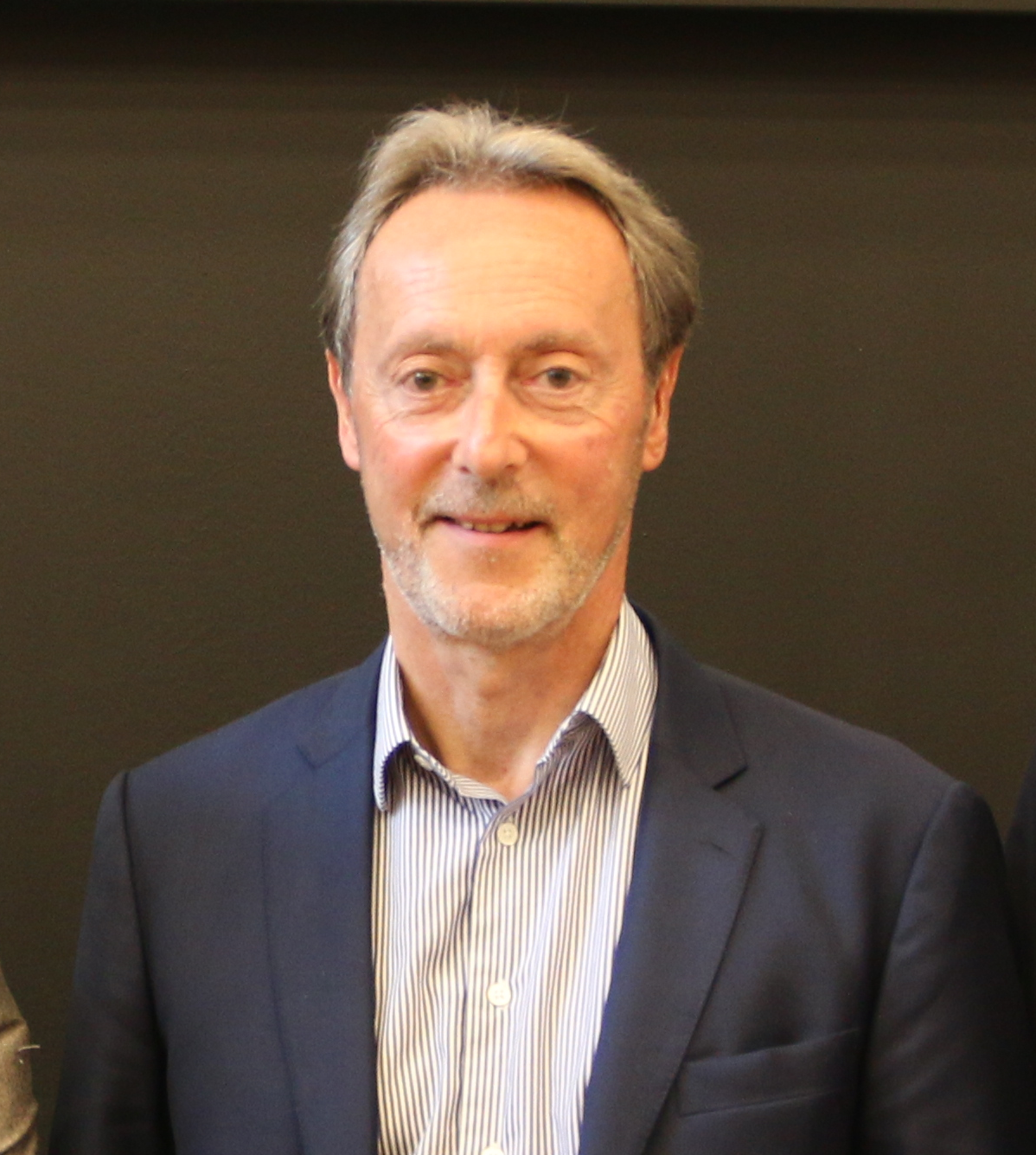
- Born: 16 July 1961 (age 65); Dijon, France
- Education: École Polytechnique, Mines ParisTech
- Occupation: CEO Palantir France

Fabrice Brégier (born 16 July 1961) is a French business executive. He was appointed president and chief operating officer of Airbus on 1 January 2017. He is on the executive committee of Airbus, which operates Airbus Commercial Aircraft, Airbus Defence and Space, and Airbus Helicopters. As of October 2018 he is now leading the French operations of Palantir Technologies.

== Early life ==
Fabrice Brégier was born in Dijon in July 1961, and graduated from École Polytechnique and École des Mines de Paris.

== Career ==
Brégier began his career in 1983 as a test engineer at the Creys-Malville Superphénix nuclear plant. In 1984, he became sales manager for French aluminium conglomerate Pechiney in Japan.

He joined the DRIRE (the French Ministry of Industry) in Alsace in 1986 before being appointed director of economic and financial affairs at the Ministry of Agriculture in 1989. A year later, as a technical advisor to the minister of foreign trade, he became responsible for multilateral business affairs. Later he was appointed technical advisor to the minister of post and telecommunications, in charge of industrial and international affairs.

MBDA

In 1993, Brégier joined Matra Défense as chairman of two projects: Apache MAW GIE (co-operation with Dasa) and Eurodrone GIE (with STN-Atlas). He was appointed director of stand-off activities (Apache, Scalp EG/Storm Shadow) in 1996, in what had become Matra BAe Dynamics.

From the beginning of 1998, he served as CEO of Matra BAe Dynamics. In 2001, he helped create the new European missile systems company MBDA from Aerospatiale Matra (France), British Aerospace (United Kingdom) and Finmeccanica (Italy). He was then appointed CEO of MBDA.

Eurocopter

In 2003, Brégier was appointed CEO and president of Eurocopter. He also became a member of the EADS (European Aeronautic Defence and Space Company) executive committee in June 2005.

Airbus

In October 2006, as EADS reorganized Airbus after delays to the A380 project, Brégier was appointed chief operating officer (COO) of Airbus Commercial Aircraft. Together with Louis Gallois, he was tasked with implementing the Power 8 reorganization plan.

Palantir Technologies

In September 2018, Brégier was to lead Palantir's French subsidiary.

== Other activities ==
- SCOR SE, Chair of the Board of Directors (since 2023)

== Awards ==
Brégier is Chevalier de la Légion d'Honneur.

Business positions
Preceded by Position Established	COO of Airbus; 2017–2018	Succeeded by Guillaume Faury
