= Catherine L. Mann =

American economist

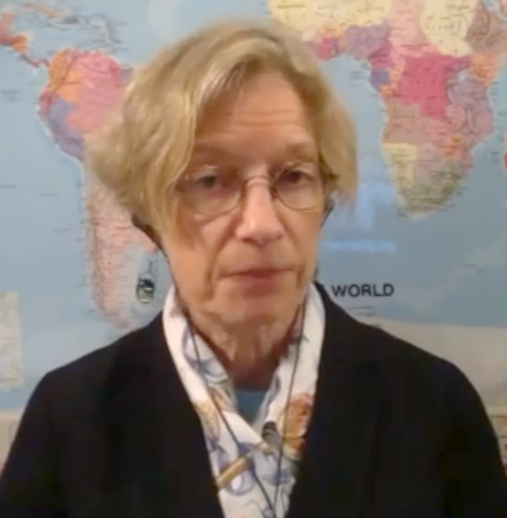
- In an online discussion in 2021
- Education: Harvard University; MIT
- Occupation: Economist

Catherine L. Mann is an American economist and an external member of the Bank of England's Monetary Policy Committee. She began her first three-year term on September 1, 2021, and was reappointed for a second term running through August 31, 2027. Before joining the committee, she was global chief economist at Citibank from February 2018 to May 2021 and chief economist and G20 finance deputy at the OECD from October 2014 to November 2017.

== Education ==
Mann has a BA in economics, magna cum laude, from Harvard University in 1977. She then proceeded to MIT where she received a Ph.D. in international economics in 1984.

== Career ==
Mann has worked as an economist in the Bush administration's Council of Economic Advisers where she advised on the European Monetary Union, Latin American economies and the transition economies of the former USSR.

She worked as an economist at the Federal Reserve, mainly in the bank's International Finance division.

Starting in 2006, Mann was a lecturer at Brandeis University and, in 2010, she was appointed Barbara '54 and Richard M. Rosenberg Professor of International Economics and Finance there. She left for the OECD in 2014 where she served as the Chief Economist and G20 Finance deputy until November 2017.

In February 2018, she became the Global Chief Economist at Citibank and served until May 2021. Mann was appointed to the Monetary Policy Committee (MPC) on September 1, 2021, and was subsequently reappointed to serve a second three-year term in 2024.

She was made a Fellow of the Royal Economic Society in May 2025.

=== Academic contribution ===
Mann's work has concentrated on U.S. trade deficit and exchange rate fluctuation of the U.S. dollar.

== Publications ==
=== Books ===
- Catherine L. Mann (1999). Is the U.S. Trade Deficit Sustainable?. Columbia University Press. pp. 224. ISBN 9780881322644.
- Catherine L. Mann (2006). Accelerating the Globalization of America: The Role for Information Technology. Columbia University Press. p. 256. ISBN 9780881323900.

=== Journal articles ===
- Catherine L. Mann (1986). "Prices, profit margins, and exchange rates". Federal Reserve Bulletin. 72 (6): 366–379.
- Catherine L. Mann; John S. Wilson; Tsunehiro Otsuki (2005). "Assessing the Benefits of Trade Facilitation: A Global Perspective". World Economy. 28 (6): 841–871. doi:10.1111/j.1467-9701.2005.00709.x. S2CID 56386069.
