= Louis Gallois =

French senior civil servant and businessman (born 1944)

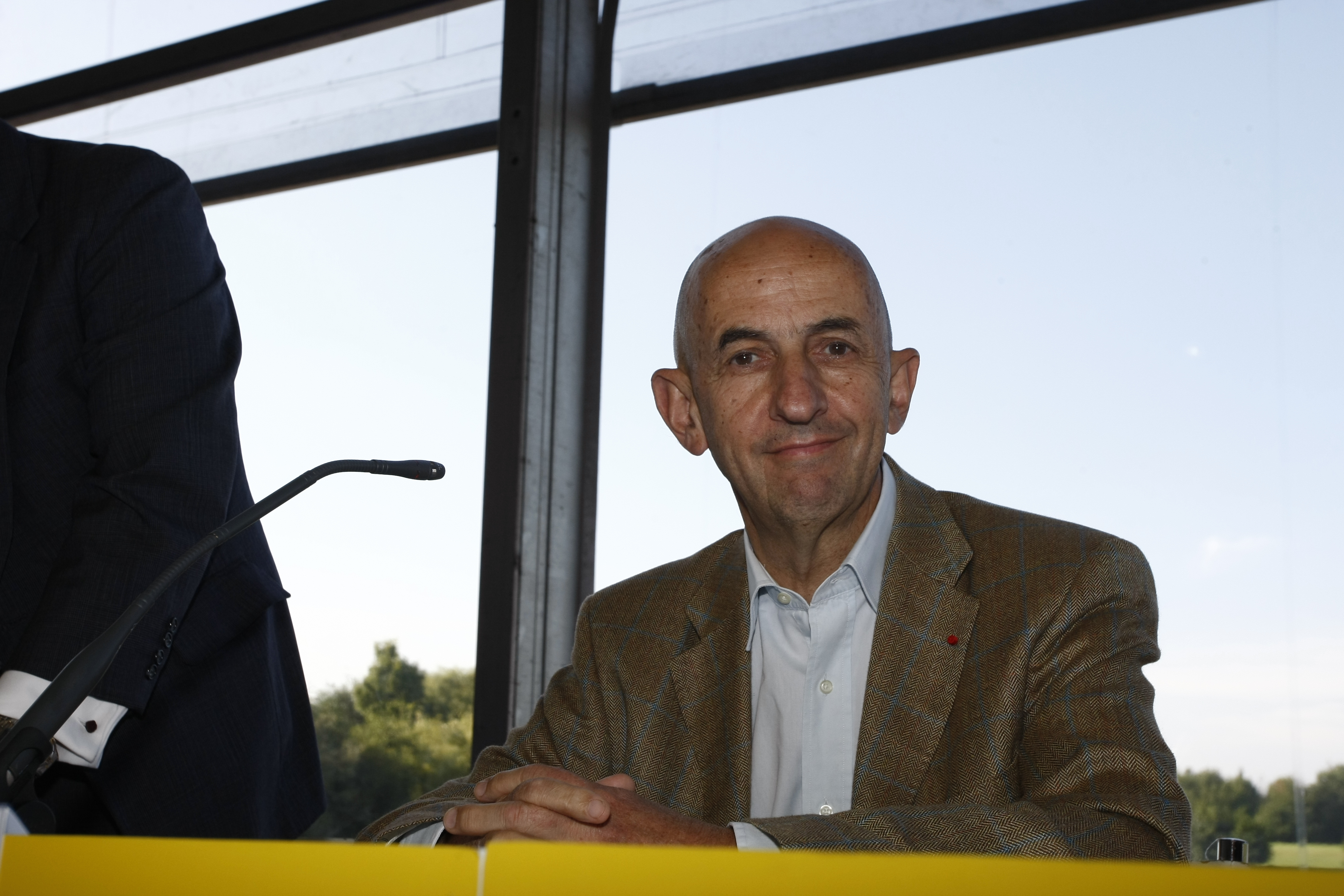
- Born: 26 January 1944 (age 81); Montauban, France
- Education: Lycée Sainte-Geneviève
- Alma mater: HEC Paris, ÉNA
- Occupation: Board of directors of École Centrale Paris

Louis René Fernand Gallois (French pronunciation: [lwi ɡalwa]; born 26 January 1944) is a French former senior civil servant and businessman. He was the CEO of EADS, the European aeronautic defense and space company, from 2007 to 2012.

== Education ==
Gallois was born and raised in Montauban, where he received his Baccalauréat in 1961. After two years of a well-known private prépa school, Sainte-Geneviève, he attended business school at HEC Paris, a Grande école, graduating in 1966. He then went on to ÉNA, one of the most prestigious grandes écoles, graduating in 1972.

== Career ==
Gallois headed several government departments during his career. He was appointed head of the civil and military cabinet in the French defense ministry (1988–1989). He was chairman and CEO of Snecma, an aircraft and rocket engine manufacturer, from 1989 to 1992, when he became CEO of Aérospatiale, a French state-owned aviation company. He headed that company until 1996, when he became President of SNCF, France's national state-owned railway company.

Gallois joined EADS on 2 July 2006 following the resignation of Noël Forgeard. Forgeard resigned after allegations of insider trading, which he denied. Forgeard had sold EADS stock weeks before its Airbus subsidiary announced that the Airbus A380 would be delayed again. The announcement caused a 26% slump in the EADS share price.

On 9 October 2006 Gallois replaced Christian Streiff as the CEO of the aircraft manufacturer Airbus S.A.S. On 16 July 2007 EADS's management structure was changed and Gallois was appointed CEO of EADS for 5 years. He was replaced on 31 May 2012 by the then CEO of Airbus, Tom Enders.

Gallois is a member of the board of directors of École Centrale Paris and President of the Fondation Villette-Entreprises.

In 2012, immediately after leaving EADS, Gallois became the government's Commissioner for Investment. He held his position until 2014.

He is elected in June 2012 president of the FNARS (Fédération nationale des associations d'accueil et de réinsertion sociale), a group focusing on social and solidarity actions.

Business positions
Preceded by Loïk Le Floch-Prigent	CEO of SNCF; 1996–2006	Succeeded by Anne-Marie Idrac
Preceded by Christian Streiff	CEO of EADS; 2007–2012	Succeeded by Tom Enders
