= Aviation in the Digital Age =

The Information Age is generally understood to have arrived with the Internet as it was developed through the 1970s and rolled out throughout the 1980s, and continues evolving to this day. So too the adoption of digital techniques in aviation also arrived progressively at around the same time and also continues today.

The use of digital computers in aircraft design was developed by large aerospace companies throughout the 1970s and included technique such as CAD, CAM, structural component stress analysis using FEA and for aerodynamic modelling. Composite materials lend themselves better than metal to fluid "organic" aerodynamic shapes of high efficiency, and the advent of sophisticated computer-aided design and modelling has led to an expansion in the use of these materials and forms.

Digital systems also appeared in the aircraft themselves and grew steadily in sophistication. The first FADEC (Full Authority Digital Engine Control) trials took place in 1968, with the first operational system entering service in 1985. The first operational fully authoritative fly-by-wire system was developed for the General Dynamics F-16 Fighting Falcon and its introduction in 1978 heralded a revolution in taking over the task of ensuring stability in flight from the traditional aerodynamic stabilizers. This use of "relaxed static stability" allowed aircraft to be made more manoeuvrable and to be given an artificial "feel" to aid pilots in their main task. Meanwhile, the "glass cockpit" was replacing the traditional analogue electro-mechanical instrumentation with graphical digital displays which could display any information selected. Early glass cockpits provided less critical flight information in the form of the EFIS system, with fully glass systems appearing from 1988.

The Cold War era ended shortly after the arrival of digital technologies, bringing a marked decrease of military aviation among the major powers. More recently the rise of the Indian and Chinese economies has spurred development of military aircraft in these countries.

== Aircraft ==
=== Relaxed static stability ===
The first operational fully authoritative fly-by-wire system was developed for the General Dynamics F-16 Fighting Falcon and its introduction in 1978 heralded a revolution in taking over the task of ensuring stability in flight from the traditional aerodynamic stabilizers. This use of "relaxed static stability" allowed aircraft to be made more manoeuvrable and to be given an artificial "feel" to aid pilots in their main task.

=== Composite materials ===
Composite materials lend themselves better than metal to fluid "organic" aerodynamic shapes of high efficiency, and the advent of sophisticated computer-aided design and modelling has led to an expansion in the use of these materials and forms.

=== Engines ===
This period has seen an upsurge in the use of electrical power systems for light aircraft and UAVs. Enabling technologies include the widespread availability and affordability of new high-performance battery technologies, high-strength rare-earth magnets in electric motors, falling costs of solar cells and sophisticated computerised control and management systems.

Meanwhile, conventional aero engines, both piston- and turbine-based, have continued the process of refinement, becoming steadily more reliable and fuel-efficient, while at the same time less polluting.

=== Avionics ===
Digital systems also appeared in the aircraft themselves and grew steadily in sophistication. Early digital systems were self-contained with limited functionality. The first FADEC (Full Authority Digital Engine Control) trials took place in 1968, with the first operational system entering service in 1985.

Integrated data systems require a digital data bus. The MIL-STD-1553 bus was defined in 1973. This enabled the first operational fully authoritative fly-by-wire system to be developed for the General Dynamics F-16 Fighting Falcon. The introduction of this aircraft in 1978 heralded a revolution in taking over the task of ensuring stability in flight from the traditional aerodynamic stabilizers. This use of "relaxed static stability" allowed aircraft to be made more manoeuvrable and to be given an artificial "feel" to aid pilots in their main task. Meanwhile, the "glass cockpit" was replacing the traditional analogue electro-mechanical instrumentation with graphical digital displays which could display any information selected. Early glass cockpits provided less critical flight information in the form of the EFIS system, with fully glass systems appearing from 1988.

=== Unmanned Aerial Vehicles ===
Prior to the Digital Age, unmanned aerial vehicles (UAV) or drones were of limited use, having either limited guidance capability or a vulnerable radio-control link back to a remote pilot.

The development of lightweight and low-cost sensors such as digital cameras together with mobile computing technologies has allowed UAVs to become more sophisticated and to undertake autonomous flight decisions. UAVs are being increasingly used in both civil and military roles.

UAVs are an attractive attack weapon because they combine the flexibility and firepower of a manned aircraft with the expendability of a missile. They have come to the fore through their use for air-to-ground surgical strikes in Afghanistan. However such use is controversial due to the risk of causing civilian deaths by mistake.

In the 21st century, civilian UAVs such as the quadcopter are increasingly being used for recreational purposes and for aerial observation via a digital camera.

A micro-UAV is small enough for several to be carried at once, and these are finding applications in military reconnaissance and scientific research.

== Civil aviation ==
During this period, civil aviation continued to expand. Airliners and engines grew larger and more fuel-efficient, while digital systems progressively took over the flight control and other avionics. Modern jet airliners have glass cockpits, full-authority digital engine and fly-by-wire computerised flight controls and, most recently, Mobile Internet communications connectivity.

Major disruptions to air travel in the 21st century included the closing of U.S. airspace due to the September 11 attacks, and the closing of most of European airspace after the 2010 eruption of Eyjafjallajökull.

=== General aviation ===
Ultralight and microlight aircraft have grown in popularity, along with other sporting activities such as paragliding.

In 1986 Dick Rutan and Jeana Yeager flew the Rutan Voyager around the world non-stop and with no aerial refuelling.

In 1999 Bertrand Piccard became the first person to circle the earth in a balloon.

== Military aviation ==
The use of digital fly-by-wire systems and relaxed static stability gave military aircraft increased manoeuvrability without sacrificing safety or flyability. Advanced tactical manoeuvres such as Pugachev's Cobra became possible.

=== Missiles ===
Digital technology allowed missile guidance systems to shrink in size and to compute and correct their flight path en route. The use of onboard maps, video processing and terrain comparison (TERCOM) software gave cruise missiles unprecedented accuracy.

=== Stealth ===
During the postwar period, radar detection was a constant threat to the attacker. Attack aircraft developed the tactic of flying at low level, "under the radar" where they were hidden by hills and other obstacles from the radar stations. The advent of low-level radar chains, as a defence against cruise missiles, made this tactic increasingly difficult. At the same time, advances in electromagnetic radiation-absorbent materials (RAM) and electromagnetic modelling techniques offered the opportunity to develop "stealthy" aircraft which would be invisible to the defending radar. The first stealthy attack aircraft, the Lockheed F-117 Nighthawk entered service in 1983. Today, stealth is a requirement for any advanced attack aircraft.

== Ground activities ==
The U.S. Centennial of Flight Commission was established in 1999 to encourage the broadest national and international participation in the celebration of 100 years of powered flight. It publicized and encouraged a number of programs, projects and events intended to educate people about the history of aviation.

=== Manufacturing ===
The widespread use of digital techniques throughout design and manufacture has led to a revolution in aircraft design. Now, a designer can create an aircraft, model its aerodynamic and mechanical characteristics, design the production components and have them manufactured on the shop floor, all within a single end-to-end digital domain.

The increasing use of fibre composite materials has also led to ever-larger autoclaves for applying and curing the resin which binds the structural fibres in place. Novel test and inspection techniques have also had to be developed, as the failure modes and symptoms of composite components tend to be very different from those made of metal. For example, layers of fibre can delaminate within a multi-layer component, weakening it with no outward visible sign of cracking. Where a metal skin tends to conduct the current from a lightning strike in all directions and to shield sensitive components, carbon fibre tends to conduct along the fibres and to allow more of the energy into the interior, requiring more careful design to protect critical flight components from lightning EMP.

The increasing sophistication of avionics systems has led to longer development times. In particular the use of digital flight systems such as fly-by-wire has led to an ever-increasing sophistication and complexity of the control software, which can take many years to develop and validate. During this period, any change to the aircraft's physical design may require revision and revalidation of the associated software.

=== Air traffic control ===
As computers became more sophisticated in the 2000s, they began to take over routine aspects of the air traffic controller's task. Up until then all air traffic in nearby airspace was tracked and displayed, with the air traffic controller responsible for monitoring its position and assessing any need for action. Modern computerised systems are capable of monitoring the flight paths of many more aircraft at a given time, allowing the controller to manage more aircraft and to focus on the decision-making and follow-up processes.

== See also ==
- History of aviation
