= Katrin Suder =

German undersecretary

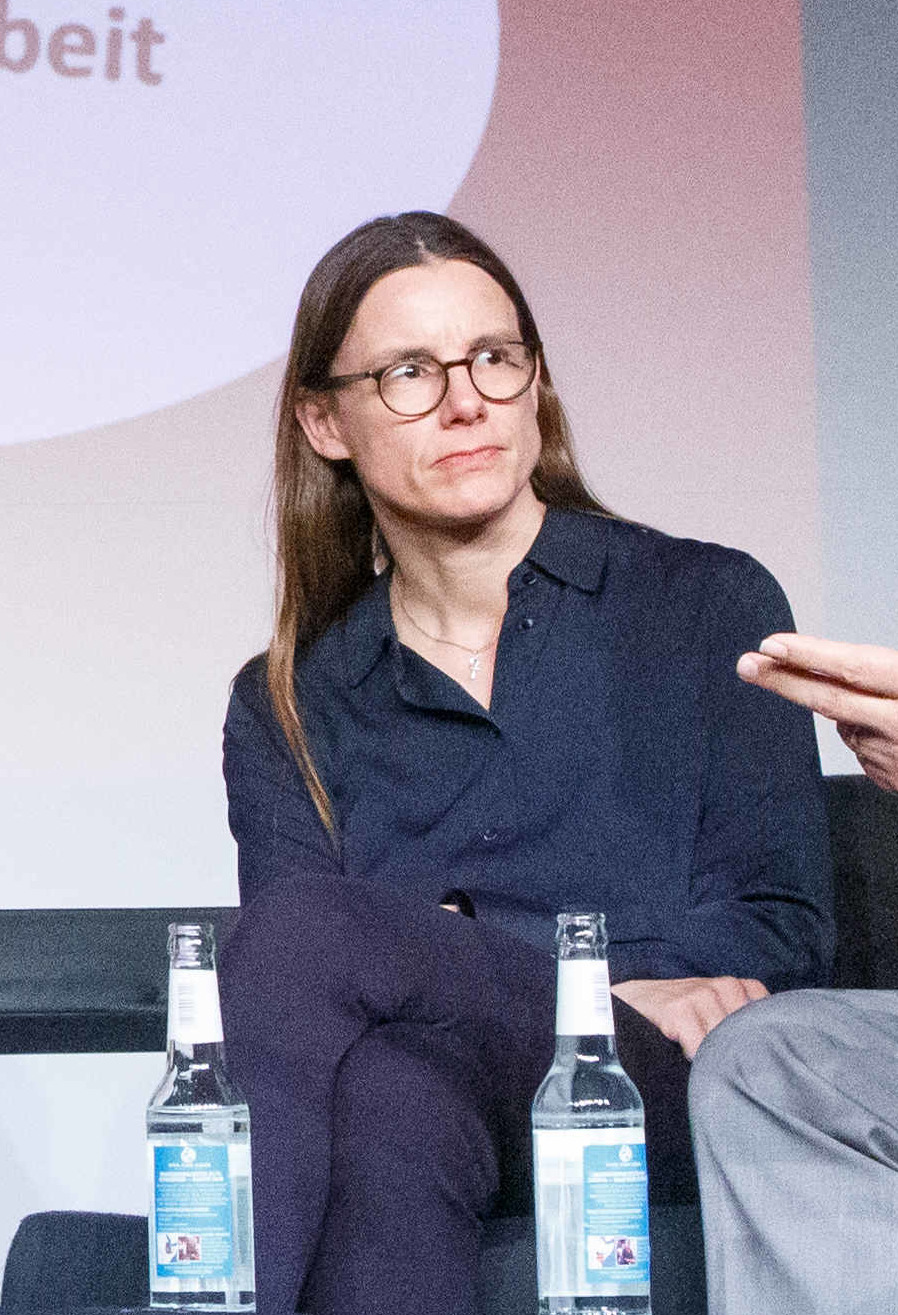

State Secretary in the Federal Ministry of Defense
- In office 1 August 2014 – April 2018
- Preceded by: Stéphane Beemelmans
- Succeeded by: Benedikt Zimmer

Personal details
- Born: 29 September 1971 (age 53); Mainz, West Germany

Katrin Suder (born 29 September 1971) is a German physicist and management consultant who served as State Secretary in the Federal Ministry of Defense in the government of Chancellor Angela Merkel from 2014 to 2018.

== Early life and education ==
Suder was born in Mainz on 29 September 1971. She studied physics at RWTH Aachen. In 2000, she received her doctorate in neuroinformatics at the Ruhr University Bochum. Suder also received a bachelor's degree in theater and linguistics there. She was a scholarship holder of the German National Academic Foundation.

== Career ==
=== McKinsey, 2000–2014 ===
From 2000, Suder worked for the management consultancy McKinsey and in 2007 took over the company's Berlin office. She made a career as a consultant for the German and international IT industry and became a director at McKinsey in 2010, where she dealt with diversity management, among other things.

From 2009 to 2014 Suder was responsible for the company's activities in the public sector. Suder worked for several years as a manager at the interface between administration and the private sector, leading reform projects for the Federal Employment Agency and developing a concept for improving the start-up culture for the State of Berlin. At McKinsey, she campaigned for an open-minded approach to different sexual orientations (LGBT diversity management).

=== Federal Ministry of Defense, 2014–2018 ===
Suder was sworn in on 1 August 2014 as a permanent state secretary in the Federal Ministry of Defense with the task of reforming the armaments sector. She thus succeeded Stéphane Beemelmans, who was put into temporary retirement in February 2014.

The departments Equipment and Cyber / Information Technology were directly subordinated to her; it was also responsible for matters relating to the Planning Department. During her time in office, she oversaw a series of changes in procurement processes aimed at making the process more transparent and insulating the German government from further cost overruns such as those seen on the A400M.

With her, Gundbert Scherf moved from McKinsey to the Federal Ministry of Defense in September 2014. He temporarily stood in for her during her baby break, but left the ministry two years later.

Suder was sanctioned and banned from entering the country by Russia in May 2015. Her name was on a list of 89 EU politicians; according to Russian sources, the ban was a reaction to sanctions against Russia.

From 11 to 14 June 2015, Suder took part in the 63rd Bilderberg Conference in Telfs-Buchen, Austria.

At her own request, Suder resigned from the office of State Secretary in April 2018. As a farewell, Minister Ursula von der Leyen awarded her the Bundeswehr Cross of Honor in gold.

=== Later career ===
In August 2018, Suder took over the chairmanship of the newly founded ten-member digital council of the German federal government. In May 2021, she was nominated to head the newly created IT department on the Board of Management of Volkswagen, but was rejected by the supervisory board.

== Other activities ==
- Deutsche Post, Member of the Supervisory Board (since 2023)
- LEG Immobilien, Member of the Supervisory Board (since 2022)
- FGS Global, Senior Advisor (since 2022)
- Cloudflare, Member of the Board of Directors (since 2019)
- Hertie School, Member of the Board of Trustees (since 2015), Senior Fellow (since 2018)

== Personal life ==
Suder lives with her partner Katja Kraus, in Hamburg and has three children. At the beginning of March 2017, she and Kraus registered a civil partnership.

Suder volunteers for Save the Children. Until 2015, she was committed to the association Lesbenfrühling e.V.
