= Guillaume Faury =

French engineer and executive (born 1968)

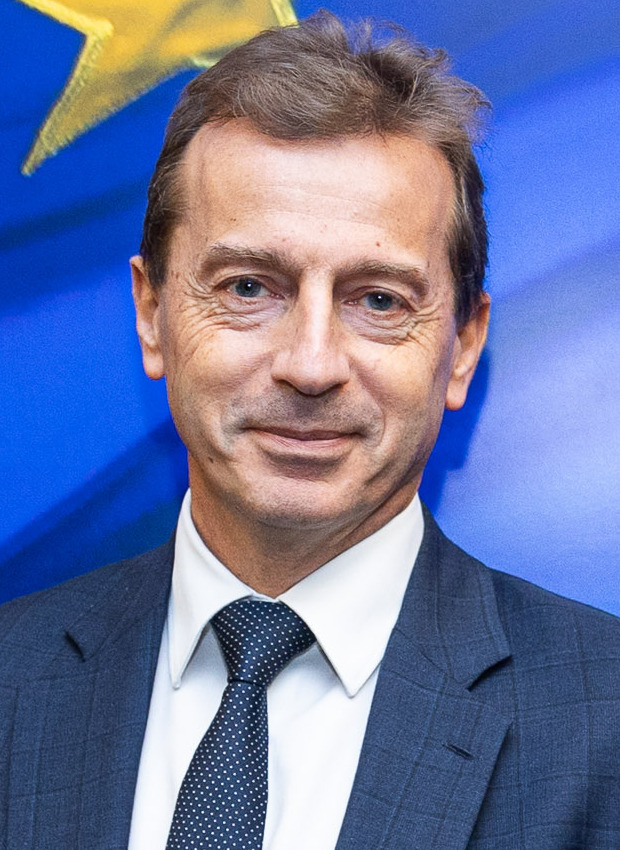
- Faury in 2023
- Born: 22 February 1968 (age 58); Cherbourg-Octeville, France
- Education: École polytechnique Supaéro; IAE Aix-en-Provence, Aix-Marseille University
- Title: CEO of Airbus (2019–present)
- Spouse: Maria Faury
- Children: 3

Guillaume Faury (French pronunciation: [ɡijom foʁi]; born 22 February 1968) is a French engineer and businessman. He is the chief executive officer (CEO) at the aerospace corporation Airbus SE and chairman of its civil aircraft division, Airbus SAS.

== Education ==
Faury was educated at Lycée François 1 in Le Havre. He graduated from the École polytechnique (Paris) in 1990 and École Nationale Supérieure de l’Aéronautique et de l’Espace in Toulouse in 1992. Certified light-aircraft pilot and helicopter flight-test engineer with over 1,300 flying hours.

== Career ==
Working at Eurocopter (now Airbus Helicopters) for ten years, Faury was the chief engineer of the EC225/H225, being responsible for the heavy helicopter flight tests. He eventually became the executive vice-president for research and development (R&D). In 2010, Faury became executive vice-president for research and development at car maker Peugeot.

In March 2013, Faury replaced Lutz Bertling as the CEO of Airbus Helicopters. As the new CEO, he faced the H225 crash in Norway, killing all thirteen people on board and grounding all H225 helicopters used in North Sea oil exploitation for a 15-month period. The sale of the helicopter model to the Polish Armed Forces was cancelled. Faury restructured the X4 program leading to the H160 medium helicopter development to be introduced in 2019, and launched the X6 development for a fly-by-wire successor to the Super Puma. He began significant R&D programs like the high-speed X3 Racer and the CityAirbus program.

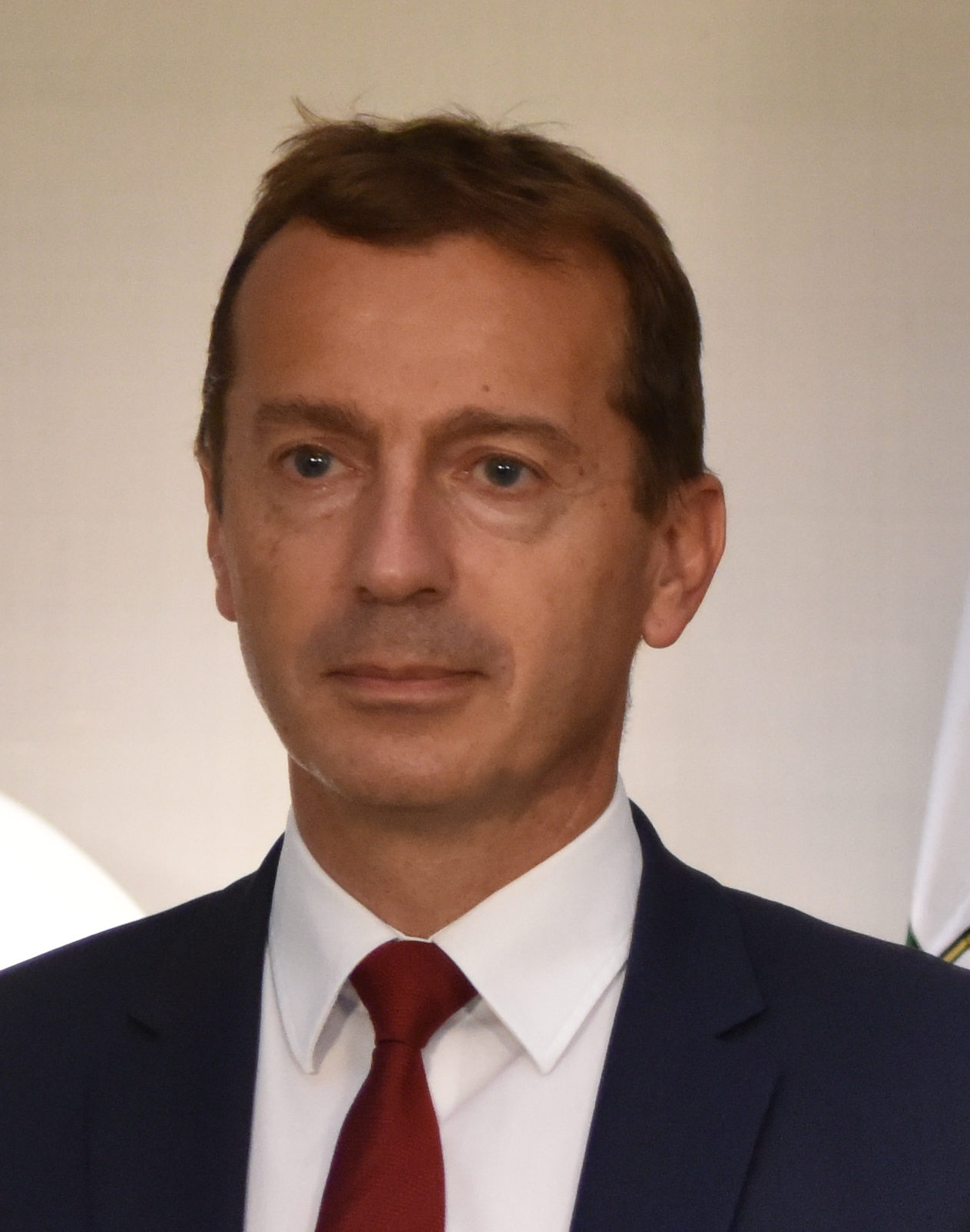
Guillaume Faury in 2019

Faury replaced Fabrice Brégier as Airbus Commercial Aircraft COO from February 2018. On 8 October 2018, the Airbus Board of Directors selected him to succeed Tom Enders as Airbus CEO, starting from 10 April 2019. Faury will have to shape Airbus' response to the Boeing New Midsize Airplane, face A320neo production and operational challenges, complete A400M negotiations and address slower-selling models like the A330neo. During the Annual General Meeting (AGM) 2022, Faury was reappointed as CEO for the next three years. Faury led the company through the recovery after the COVID-19 pandemic and the continued development of an environmentally friendly aircraft fueled by hydrogen.

On 1 December 2022, Faury was one of the guests invited to a state dinner hosted by U.S. President Joe Biden in honor of President Emmanuel Macron at the White House.

== Personal life ==
He is married to Maria Faury, and they have three children.

== Other activities ==
- European Round Table for Industry (ERT), Member

Business positions
Preceded by Fabrice Brégier	COO of Airbus; 2018–2019	Succeeded by Michael Schöllhorn
Preceded by Tom Enders	CEO of Airbus; 2019–present	Succeeded by Incumbent
