= Thomas Ahrenkiel =

Danish civil servant

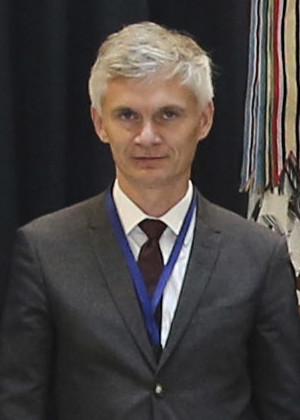
- Ahrenkiel in 2019

Personal details
- Born: Thomas Ahrenkiel; 19 October 1967 (age 58) Denmark

Thomas Ahrenkiel (born 19 October 1967) is a Danish politician who was formerly the head of the Ministry of Defense and the Defense Intelligence Service there.

== Biography ==
Ahrenkiel was born on 19 October 1967.

He received a degree in economics from the University of Copenhagen. Ahrenkiel was also a member of the Foreign Service, including as a Ministerial Counselor in the Prime Minister's Office and as an Embassy Secretary in Brussels.

In 2005, he became a Knight of Dannebrog and he is a member of the Bilderberg group.

Ahrenkiel is known in the cases of fraud in the Ministry of Defence's Property Agency. He has previously, in 2018, received criticism from the Chamber Advocate, after he in 2016 had participated in a meeting where his then girlfriend and current wife received a salary increase of 1,500 kroner monthly and a lump sum of 75,000 kroner. Before the wage negotiations, however, he had told the Prime Minister's Head of Department Christian Kettel Thomsen, who is the country's top official, about the matter, so he escaped further prosecution in the case as he had allegedly acted in good faith.

Ahrenkiel was to leave the Ministry of Defense on 1 September 2020 to take up the position of Danish Ambassador to Berlin. However, in connection with the case of the Defense Intelligence Service, where he is former chief, he was 24.8. exempted from service and repatriated with immediate notice.
