= Bruchertseifen =

- Municipality
- Location of Bruchertseifen within Altenkirchen district
- Interactive map of Bruchertseifen
- Location within Germany Location within Rhineland-Palatinate
- Coordinates: 50°44′47″N 7°42′49″E
- Country: Germany
- State: Rhineland-Palatinate
- District: Altenkirchen
- Municipal assoc.: Hamm (Sieg)
- Subdivisions: 3

Government
  - Mayor (2019–24): Axel Mast

Area
  - Total: 2.89 km^{2} (1.12 sq mi)
- Elevation: 275 m (902 ft)

Population (2025-12-31)
  - Total: 827
  - Density: 286/km^{2} (741/sq mi)
- Time zone: UTC+01:00 (CET)
  - Summer (DST): UTC+02:00 (CEST)
- Postal codes: 57539
- Dialling codes: 02682
- Vehicle registration: AK
- Website: www.hamm-sieg.de

Bruchertseifen is a municipality in the district of Altenkirchen, in Rhineland-Palatinate, Germany.
