= Christian Streiff =

French businessman

- Born: 21 September 1954 (age 71); Sarrebourg, France
- Education: Mines ParisTech
- Occupation: Businessman

Christian Streiff (born 21 September 1954) is a French businessman.

Streiff was born at Sarrebourg, Moselle. He was nominated chief executive officer of the European commercial aircraft manufacturer Airbus S.A.S. on 2 July 2006. He resigned from this position three months later, on 9 October 2006, and was replaced by Louis Gallois that same day. According to a former Airbus employee, Streiff found himself "isolated" in his plans to restructure Airbus and offered to quit.

One month later, Streiff was appointed the chief executive officer of the second-largest European car maker, PSA Peugeot Citroën. On Sunday 29 March 2009 the board of PSA Peugeot Citroën ousted Streiff, stating publicly that a change in leadership was needed to "unlock the group's potential."
