= Noël Forgeard =

French businessman (born 1946)

- Born: 8 December 1946 (age 79); La Ferté-Gaucher, France
- Education: École Polytechnique, Mines ParisTech
- Occupation: Businessman

Noël Forgeard (French pronunciation: [nɔɛl fɔʁʒaʁ]; born 8 December 1946 in La Ferté-Gaucher) is a French industrialist and former joint CEO of EADS.

== Appointment ==
From April 1998 until June 2005, Forgeard was CEO of the aircraft manufacturer Airbus SAS.

In late 2004, he was nominated as the next French CEO of EADS. This position is shared with a German—then Thomas Enders—in a system that was established at the creation of EADS in 2000.

== Alleged insider dealing ==
News reports in June 2006 focused on possible insider dealing at EADS. Forgeard made a 2.5 million Euro profit on the sale of EADS shares, with his children earning 4.2 million Euro, just weeks before news of Airbus A380 delays was released. Forgeard denied any wrongdoing, claiming that he was a scapegoat in the matter.

Forgeard resigned as CEO of EADS on 2 July 2006 and was replaced by Christian Streiff.
