= Natalia (given name) =

- Gender: Female

Origin
- Origin: Latin
- Meaning: Christmas Day

Natalia is a female given name with the original Late Latin meaning of "Christmas Day" (cf. Latin natale domini).

In Russian, a common diminutive is Natasha (Наташа).

== Variants and derived forms of given name Natalia ==
- Nathalie: English, French, Dutch, German, Slovak, Scandinavian languages, Romanian, Finnish, Luxembourgish, Hungarian, Corsican, Czech, Catalan, Malagasy, Slovenian, Spanish, Latin, Estonian
- Nathaly: Spanish, English
- Nataly: English, Spanish
- Natalia, Nathalie, Natasha, Natasya, Natalya, Nathalie : Indonesian
- Natalija: Serbo-Croatian.
- Nataliia: Ukrainian
- Natalyne: English
- Nataline: English, French, Scandinavian languages, Catalan, Corsican, Italian, Hungarian, German, Dutch, Portuguese, Latin, Romanian, Estonian, Czech, Finnish, Slavic languages
- Natalis: Latin

== Notable people ==
- Natalia of Nicomedia (died 306), Christian saint
- Natalia of Córdoba (died 852), Christian saint
- Natalia Abello Vives (born 1967), Colombian lawyer and politician
- Natalia Abeso (born 1986), Equatoguinean footballer
- Natalia Acuña (born 2002), Mexican footballer
- Natalia Afremova (born 1998), Russian cyclist
- Natalia Aispurúa (born 1991), Argentine volleyball player
- Natalia Alaverdian, Belgian businesswoman
- Natalia Albert, New Zealand political candidate
- Natalia Alekhina (born 1954), Russian chess player
- Natalia Alexeievna (1755–1776), Tsarevna of Russia
- Natalia Alieva (1931–2015), Russian linguist
- Natalia Alimova (born 1978), Russian volleyball player
- Natalia Almada, Mexican-American photographer and filmmaker
- Natalia Alonso, American ballet dancer
- Natalia Alyakina (c. 1955–1995), Russian journalist
- Natalia Ananjeva (born 1946), Russian herpetologist
- Natalia Anciso (born 1985), American Chicana-Tejana contemporary artist and educator
- Natalia Andrienko, Ukrainian computer scientist
- Natalia Androsova (1917–1999), Princess Romanovskaya-Iskander of Russia
- Natalia Annenko (born 1964), Russian ice dancer
- Natalia Anoikina (born 1987), Russian basketball player
- Natalia Antonova (born 1995), Russian cyclist
- Natalia Arbelaez (born 1983), American ceramicist, sculptor, and educator
- Natalia Arias, British-born photographer
- Natalia Ariza (born 1991), Colombian footballer
- Natalia Arroyo (born 1986), Spanish footballer and journalist
- Natalia Artemieva, Russian planetary scientist
- Natalia Aspesi (born 1929), Italian journalist
- Natalia Astrain (born 1976), Spanish soccer player and commentator
- Natalia Aszkenazy (1915–1988), Polish diplomat and writer
- Natalia Autric (born 1964), Spanish swimmer
- Natalia Avdeeva (born 1988), Russian compound archer
- Natalia Avelon (born 1980), Polish-German actress and singer
- Natalia Bajor (born 1997), Polish table tennis player
- Natalia Bamber-Laskowska (born 1982), Polish volleyball player
- Natalia Baquedano (1872–1936), Mexican photographer
- Natalia Barbashina (born 1973), Russian footballer and coach
- Natalia Barbu (born 1979), Moldovan singer
- Natalia Bardo (born 1988), Russian actress, singer and TV host
- Natalia Bartnovskaya (born 1989), Russian pole vaulter
- Natalia Basarab (born 1954), Ukrainian artist
- Natalia Bazhanova (1947–2014), Russian political scientist
- Natalia Bekhtereva (1924–2008), Russian neuroscientist and psychologist
- Natalia Belchenko (born 1973), Ukrainian poet and translator
- Natalia (Belgian singer) (born 1980), Belgian singer
- Natalia Maree Belting (1915–1997), American author and academic
- Natalia Beristáin (born 1981), Mexican filmmaker
- Natalia Berloff (born 1968), Russian mathematician
- Natalia Bessmertnova (1941–2008), Russian ballet dancer
- Natalia Bestemianova (born 1960), Russian ice dancer
- Natalia Biletskaya (born 1972), Ukrainian tennis player
- Natália Blahová (born 1974), Slovak politician
- Natalia Bobro (born 1984), Ukrainian entrepreneur and scientist
- Natalia Bobrova (1978–2015), Russian artistic gymnast
- Natalia Bolotova (born 1963), Russian archer
- Natalia Borges Polesso, Brazilian writer
- Natalia Botello (born 2002), Mexican fencer
- Natalia Boyarskaya (born 1983), Russian cyclist
- Natalia Boytsun (born 1960), Ukrainian government official, economist and scientist
- Natalia Brasova (1880–1952), Russian noblewoman
- Natalia Bratiuk (born 1986), Russian cross-country skier and biathlete
- Natalia Broniarczyk, Polish abortion rights activist
- Natalia Bryant (born 2003), American model, daughter of Kobe and Vanessa Bryant
- Natalia Buchynska (born 1977), Ukrainian singer
- Natalia Bukowiecka (born 1998), Polish sprinter
- Natalia Bush (born 1984), Spanish model
- Natalia Buzunova (born 1958), Olympic field hockey player
- Natalia Bykova (born 1958), Soviet field hockey player
- Natalia Cabrerizo (born 1980), Spanish swimmer
- Natalia Campos (born 1992), Chilean footballer
- Natalia Carvajal (born 1990), Costa Rican communications professional and beauty pageant titleholder
- Natalia Castañeda Arbelaez (born 1982), Colombian painter
- Natalia Castillo (born 1982), Chilean politician
- Natalia Castrén (1830–1881), Finnish culture personality and salon hostess
- Natalia Cercheș (born 1976), Moldovan long-distance runner
- Natàlia Cerezo, Catalan writer
- Natalia Chaban, Ukrainian professor of communication
- Natalia Charłos (born 1993), Polish-German swimmer
- Natalia Chatzigiannidou (born 1979), Greek footballer
- Natalia Chernogolova (born 1954), Belarusian artist
- Natalia Chernova (born 1976), Russian trampoline gymnast
- Natalia Chigirinova (born 1993), Russian handball player
- Natalia Christofi (born 1997), Cypriot athlete
- Natalia Chudzik (born 1989), Polish football attacking midfielder
- Natalia Chueca (born 1976), Spanish politician
- Natalia Chumakova (born 1969), Russian musician and journalist
- Natalia Cigliuti (born 1978), Uruguayan-American actress
- Natalia Cimin (born 1979), Italian softball player
- Natalia Clare (1919–2007), American ballet dancer and instructor
- Natalia Clovis (born 1943), American fencer
- Natalia Colin (born 2005), Mexican footballer
- Natalia Contesse (born 1978), Chilean folk musician and historian
- Natalia Cooper (born 1984), Australian reporter and presenter
- Natalia Cordova-Buckley (born 1982), Mexican-American actress
- Natália Correia (1923–1993), Portuguese writer and social activist
- Natalia Cruz (born 1976), Colombian-American journalist and actress
- Natalia Cuevas (born 1966), Chilean singer, comedian, impressionist and actress
- Natalia Cuglievan (born 1997), Peruvian water skier
- Natalia Czerwonka (born 1988), Polish speed skater
- Natalia Damini (born 1992), Brazilian singer
- Natalia Danesi Murray (1901–1994), American publisher
- Natalia Davidovici (born 1971), Moldovan politician and journalist
- Natalia Deeva (born 1979), Belarusian swimmer
- Natalia Diachkova (born 1994), Russian kickboxer
- Natalia Dianskaya (born 1989), Russian volleyball player
- Natalia Dicenta (born 1962), Spanish actress
- Natalia Dik (born 1961), Russian painter
- Natalia Doco (born 1982), Argentine-French singer
- Natalia Dominiak (born 1998), Polish modern pentathlete
- Natalia Donets (born 1957), Ukrainian politician
- Natalia Dontcheva (born 1969), Bulgarian actress
- Natalia Dorado (born 1967), Spanish field hockey player
- Natalia Doussopoulou (born 1983), Greek singer
- Natalia Drobot (born 2005), Australian canoeist
- Natalia Dubova (born 1948), Russian ice dancer
- Natália Dubovcová (born 1990), Slovak beach volleyball player
- Natalia Dubrovinskaia (born 1961), Swedish geologist
- Natalia Duco (born 1989), Chilean shot putter
- Natalia Dudinskaya (1912–2003), Soviet ballet dancer
- Natalia Dumitresco (1915–1997), French painter
- Natalia Duritskaya (born 1960), Russian painter
- Natalia Dyer (born 1995), American actress
- Natalia Edzgveradze (born 1975), Georgian chess player
- Natalia Efimova (born 1983), Russian orienteering competitor
- Natalia Egorova (born 1966), Soviet/Russian tennis player
- Natalia Erdyniyeva (born 1988), Russian archer
- Natalia Eremina (born 1967), Latvian chess player
- Natalia Ermolenko-Yuzhina (1881–1937), Russian opera singer
- Natalia Escalera (born 2002), Mexican artistic gymnast
- Natalia Escuriola (born 1994), Spanish professional golfer
- Natalia Esperón (born 1974), Mexican actress
- Natalia Esquivel (born 1973), Costa Rican composer, guitarist, singer-songwriter and author
- Natalia Evangelidou (born 1991), Cypriot middle-distance runner
- Natalia Expósito (born 1997), Spanish footballer
- Natalia Fabia (born 1983), Polish-American painter
- Natália Falavigna (born 1984), Brazilian taekwondo practitioner
- Natalia Fedner (born 1983), American fashion designer and actress
- Natalia Fileva (1963–2019), Russian businesswoman
- Natalia Filippova (born 1975), Russian footballer
- Natalia Aleksandrovna Filippova (1930–2018), USSR-Russian acarologist
- Natália Fondrková (born 1997), Slovak national field hockey player
- Natalia Fonseca (born 1998), Angolan handball player
- Natalia Elena Gadano (born 1982), Argentine politician
- Natalia Gaitán (born 1991), Colombian footballer
- Natalia Gajl, Polish lawyer and economist
- Natalia Galibarenko (born 1978), Ukrainian diplomat
- Natalia Gallego Sanchez (born 1992), Colombian street artist
- Natalia Gambaro (born 1977), Argentine politician
- Natalia Gantimurova (born 1991), Russian beauty pageant titleholder
- Natalia Garbellotto (born 1984), Argentine tennis player
- Natalia García (born 1994), Spanish retired rhythmic gymnast
- Natalia Gatti (born 1982), Argentine footballer
- Natália Gaudio (born 1992), Brazilian rhythmic gymnast
- Natalia Gavrilița (born 1977), Prime Minister of Moldova
- Natalia Gemperle (born 1990), Swiss orienteering competitor
- Natalia Germanou (born 1965), Greek songwriter, entertainer, and journalist
- Natália Germáni (born 1993), Slovak actress
- Natalia Gheorghiu (1914–2001), Soviet Moldovan pediatric surgeon
- Natalia Gherman (born 1969), Moldovan politician
- Natalia Ghilascu (born 1980), Moldovan journalist
- Natalia Ghilzon (born 1990), Canadian professional golfer
- Natalia Ginzburg (1916–1991), Italian writer
- Natalia Giraldo (born 2003), Colombian footballer
- Natalia Goagoses (born 1962), Namibian politician
- Natalia Godunko (born 1984), Ukrainian rhythmic gymnast
- Natalia Golomidova (born 1995), Russian judoka
- Natalia Golts (born 1985), Russian freestyle wrestler
- Natalia Gómez Junco (born 1992), Mexican footballer
- Natalia Gomez-Ospina, Colombian physician-scientist
- Natalia Goncharova (1881–1962), Russian avant-garde artist
- Natalia Goncharova (diver) (born 1988), Russian diver
- Natalia González (born 1977), Chilean politician
- Natalia Gordienko (born 1987), Moldovan singer
- Natalia Górriz (born 1868, date of death unknown), Guatemalan writer and professor
- Natalia Grace (born 2003), Ukrainian-born American adoptee with dwarfism
- Natália Grausová (born 1953), Slovak physician and politician
- Natalia Grima, Argentinian pianist and musical educator
- Natalia Grossman (born 2001), American rock climber
- Natalia Grosvenor, Duchess of Westminster (born 1959), British aristocrat
- Natalia Gudina (born 1977), Ukrainian-born Israeli figure skater
- Natalia Gudkova (born 1974), Russian Paralympic athlete
- Natalia Guerrero (born 1987), Mexican actress
- Natalia Guitler (born 1987), Brazilian former professional tennis player
- Natália Guimarães (born 1984), Brazilian actress
- Natalia Gulkina (born 1964), Russian singer
- Natalia Guseva (born 1982), Russian biathlete
- Natalia Gussoni (born 1981), Argentine tennis player
- Natalia Gutman (born 1942), Russian cellist
- Natalia Hadjiloizou (born 1979), Cypriot swimmer
- Natalia Hanikoğlu (born 1975), Turkish-Russian volleyball player
- Natalia Hawthorn (born 1995), Canadian long-distance runner
- Natália Hejková (born 1954), Slovak basketball player and coach
- Natalia Hissamutdinova (born 1983), Estonian swimmer
- Natalia Humeniuk, Ukrainian servicewoman
- Natalia Hussey-Burdick (born 1989), American politician
- Natalia Idrisova, Tajikistani green energy consultant
- Natalia Iezlovetska, Ukrainian Paralympic athlete
- Natalia Ilienko (born 1967), Soviet artistic gymnast
- Natalia-Elena Intotero (born 1976), Romanian politician
- Natalia Iretskaya (1845–1922), Russian opera singer
- Natalia Ishchenko (born 1986), Russian synchronized swimmer
- Natalia Ivaneeva (born 1990), Russian swimmer
- Natalia Ivanova, several people
- Natalia Janotha (1856–1932), Polish pianist and composer
- Natalia Jasińska (born 1990), Polish Paralympic athlete
- Natalia Jaster, American author
- Natalia Jiménez (born 1981), Spanish singer-songwriter
- Natalia Jiménez (gymnast) (born 2006), Colombian rhythmic gymnast
- Natalia John (born 1996), Welsh rugby union player
- Natalia Juárez (born 1995), Mexican actress
- Natália do Júnior Garimpeiro (born 2004), Brazilian politician
- Natalia Kaliada, Belarusian theatre producer
- Natalia Kalinina (born 1973), Soviet and Russian gymnast
- Natalia Kaliszek (born 1996), Polish ice dancer
- Natalia Kalmykova (born 1982), Ukrainian politician
- Natalia Kałucka (born 2001), Polish speed climber
- Natalia Kanem (born 1954), Panamanian-American medical doctor
- Natalia Kapchuk (born 1984), Russian artist
- Natalia Kapitonova (born 2000), Russian artistic gymnast
- Natalia Karasseva (born 1977), Russian footballer
- Natalia Karp (1911–2007), Polish musician
- Natalia Karpenkova (born 1970), Belarusian trampoline gymnast
- Natalia Kasatkina (1934–2024), Russian ballerina and choreographer
- Natália Kelly (born 1994), American-Austrian actress
- Natalia Khabibullina (born 2004), Russian pair skater
- Natalia Kharakoz (1935–2022), Ukrainian journalist and writer
- Natalia Kharlampieva (born 1952), Yakut poet and journalist
- Natalia Khlestkina (born 1992), Russian weightlifter
- Natalia Khoma, Ukrainian-born cellist
- Natalia Khoreva (born 1986), Russian luger
- Natalia Khoudgarian (born 1973), Russian-born Canadian chess player
- Natalia Kicka (1806–1888), Polish archaeologist and numismatist
- Natalia Kills (born 1986), English singer and actress
- Natalia Kliewer, Kyrgyz-German operations researcher
- Natalia Kochańska (born 1996), Polish sport shooter
- Natalia Kocherova (born 1990), Russian wheelchair racer and cross-country skier
- Natália Kodajová (born 1968), Slovak swimmer
- Natalia Kohen, Argentine artist and writer
- Natalia Kołat (born 1987), Polish tennis player
- Natalia Komarova (born 1971), Russian-American applied mathematician
- Natalia Kononenko (born 1994), Ukrainian artistic gymnast
- Natalia Konopleva (1944–2011), Russian chess player
- Natalia Korolevska (born 1975), Ukrainian politician
- Natalia Korolkova, British-Russian physicist and academic
- Natalia Korwin-Szymanowska (1857–1952), Polish writer, journalist and translator
- Natalia Kosikhina (born 1972), Russian politician
- Natalia Kosmina (born 1982), Ukrainian para table tennis player
- Natalia Kot (born 1938), Polish former artistic gymnast
- Natalia Kowalska (chess player), Polish chess player
- Natalia Kowalska (born 1989), Polish racing driver
- Natalia Kozioł, Polish rhythmic gymnast
- Natalia Krachinnekova, Soviet rhythmic gymnast
- Natalia Krandievskaya (1888–1963), Russian poet and memoirist
- Natalia Krestianinova, Russian former pair skater
- Natália Kročková (born 2008), Slovak tennis player
- Natalia Kubaty (born 1995), Polish freestyle wrestler
- Natalia Kuchinskaya (born 1949), Soviet Olympic gymnast
- Natalia Kucirkova (born 1985), Slovak academic
- Natalia Kuikka (born 1995), Finnish footballer
- Natalia Kuipers (born 2002), Virgin Islander swimmer
- Natalia Kukulska (born 1976), Polish singer
- Natalia Kurakina (1766–1831), Russian composer
- Natalia Kusendova, Canadian politician
- Natalia Kushnir (born 1954), Soviet volleyball player
- Natalia Kutateladze, Georgian mezzo-soprano
- Natalia Kutuzova (born 1975), Russian water polo player
- Natalia Kuziutina (born 1989), Russian judoka and mixed martial artist
- Natalia Kuzmina (born 1957), Russian retired rhythmic gymnastics coach
- Natalia Lach-Lachowicz (1937–2022), Polish artist
- Natalia Lacunza (born 1999), Spanish singer-songwriter
- Natalia Lafourcade (born 1984), Mexican singer-songwriter
- Natália Lage (born 1978), Brazilian actress
- Natalia Landsberg (1846–1910), Russian anarchist activist
- Natalia Lashchenova (born 1973), Soviet Olympic gymnast
- Natalia Lavrova (1984–2010), Russian rhythmic gymnast
- Natalia Leipus (born 1962), Australian tennis player
- Natalia Leite (born 1985), Brazilian writer and director
- Natalia Lengauer (1908–1997), Ukrainian doctor
- Natalia Leśniak (born 1991), Polish archer
- Natalia Lesz (born 1981), Polish singer
- Natalia Levchenkova (born 1977), Moldovan biathlete
- Natalia Linares (born 2003), Colombian athlete
- Natalia Linichuk (born 1956), Russian ice dancer and coach
- Natalia Linos (born 1982), American social epidemiologist and politician
- Natalia Lipkovskaya (born 1979), Russian rhythmic gymnast
- Natalia M. Litchinitser, electrical engineer and professor
- Natalia Litvinova, Argentine poet
- Natalia Livingston (born 1976), American actress
- Natalia Liwycka-Chołodna (1902–2005), Ukrainian poet
- Natalia Llamosa (born 1997), Colombian weightlifter
- Natalia Lobova (born 1986), Russian canoeist
- Natalia López (born 1999), Colombian model and beauty pageant titleholder
- Natalia Lopukhina (1699–1763), Russian noble
- Natalia Lovece (born 1978), Argentine biathlete
- Natalia Lozovsky, medieval historian
- Natalia de Luccas (born 1996), Brazilian swimmer
- Natalia Luis-Bassa (born 1966), Venezuelan orchestral conductor
- Natalia Macfarren (1827–1916), English musician, composer and music translator
- Natalia Madaj (born 1988), Polish rower
- Natalia Magnat (1954–1997), Russian translator and author
- Natalia Majluf (born 1967), Peruvian historian
- Natalia Makarova (born 1940), Russian prima ballerina and choreographer
- Natalia Málaga (born 1964), Peruvian volleyball player and coach
- Natalia Malakhovskaia (born 1947), Russian feminist and writer
- Natalia Maliszewska (born 1995), Polish speed skater
- Natalia Malleus (born 1954), Estonian politician
- Natalia Malykh (born 1993), Russian volleyball player
- Natalia Malysheva (born 1994), Russian freestyle wrestler
- Natalia Mann, New Zealand harpist
- Nataliia Mandryk (born 1988), Ukrainian Paralympic wheelchair fencer
- Natalia Mărășescu (born 1952), Romanian middle-distance runner
- Natalia Markova (born 1989), Russian professional wrestler
- Natalia Martínez (born 2000), Dominican volleyball player
- Natalia Martirosyan (1889–1960), Armenian engineer
- Natalia Martyasheva (1988–2011), Russian para table tennis player
- Natalia Más (born 1963), Spanish swimmer
- Natalia Mashina (born 1997), Russian footballer
- Natalia Matolinets (born 1990), Ukrainian novelist and short stories writer
- Natalia Matsak (born 1982), Ukrainian ballet dancer
- Natalia Mauleón (born 2002), Mexican footballer
- Natália Mayara (born 1994), Brazilian wheelchair tennis player
- Natalya Medvedeva, several people
- Natalia Mela (1923–2019), Greek sculptor
- Natalia Melcon (born 1990), Argentine actress
- Natalia Méndez (born 1997), Argentine racquetball player
- Natalia Mikhailova (born 1986), Russian former competitive ice dancer
- Natália Milanová (born 1982), Slovak politician
- Natalia Millán (born 1969), Spanish actress
- Natalia Mills (born 1993), Panamanian footballer
- Natalia Mishkutionok (born 1970), Belarusian pair skater
- Natalia Mohylevska (born 1975), Ukrainian singer
- Natalia Molchanova (1962–2015), Russian multiple world record holding freediver
- Natalia Molebatsi, South African writer
- Natalia de Molina (born 1990), Spanish actress
- Natalia Molina (politician) (born 1993), Colombian government official
- Natalia Molina, American historian and professor
- Natalia Montilla (born 1998), Spanish footballer
- Natalia Morari (born 1984), Moldovan journalist
- Natalia Munteanu (born 1993), Moldovan footballer
- Natalia Nasaridze (born 1972), Turkish archer
- Natalia Navarro (born 1987), Colombian beauty pageant titleholder
- Natalia Nazarova, several people
- Natalia Negru (1882–1962), Romanian poet and prose writer
- Natalia Nemchinova (born 1975), Ukrainian tennis player
- Natalia Nikitina (born 1996), Russian handball player
- Natalia Nogulich (born 1950), American actress
- Natalia Nordman (1863–1914), Russian author
- Natalia Nosek (born 1998), Polish handball player
- Natalia Novikova, Australian actress
- Natalia Nowakowska (born 1977), historian and academic
- Natalia Nykiel (born 1995), Polish singer and songwriter

- Natalia Oleszkiewicz (born 2002), Polish footballer

- Natalia Oreiro (born 1977), Uruguayan singer and actress
- Natalia Osińska, Polish writer
- Natalia Osipova (born 1986), Russian ballerina
- Natalia Ovtchinnikova (born 1948), Soviet rhythmic gymnast
- Natalia Pablos (born 1985), Spanish international footballer
- Natalia Pacierpnik (born 1988), Polish canoeist
- Natalia Paderina (born 1975), Russian sport shooter
- Natalia Padilla (born 2002), Polish footballer
- Natalia Pakulska (born 1991), Polish footballer
- Natalia Palavandishvili (1921–2006), Georgian painter, graphic artist, and illustrator
- Natalia Pavlovna Paley (1905–1981), Russian aristocrat
- Natalia Pallu-Neves (born 2004), Brazilian ice dancer
- Natalia Panchenko (born 1988), Polish-Ukrainian activist
- Natalia Pankina, Russian swimmer
- Natalia Pankova (born 1965), Russian painter
- Natalia Parés Vives (born 1955), Spanish chess player and teacher
- Natalia Parhomenko (born 1979), Ukrainian handball player
- Natalia París (born 1973), Colombian media personality and socialite
- Natalia Partyka (born 1989), Polish para table tennis player
- Natalia Paruz, musical saw player
- Natalia Pasternak Taschner (born 1976), Brazilian microbiologist and science advocate
- Natalia Pavlova (born 1956), Russian pair skating coach and former competitor
- Natalia Pelevine (born 1976), British-Russian playwright, political activist and blogger
- Natália Pereira (born 1989), Brazilian volleyball player
- Natalia Perepechina (born 1990), Russian footballer
- Natalia Pereverzeva (born 1988), Russian model
- Natalia Perkins, Russian-American physicist
- Natalia Permiakova (born 1970), Belarusian biathlete
- Natalia Perminova (born 1991), Russian badminton player
- Natalia Pertseva (born 1984), Russian footballer
- Natalia Pervaiz (born 1995), Pakistani cricketer
- Natalia Petkevich (born 1972), Belarusian politician
- Natalia Mehlman Petrzela, American historian
- Natalia Pichuzhkina (born 1991), Russian rhythmic gymnast
- Natalia Piekarczyk (born 1988), Polish volleyball player
- Natalia Piergentili (born 1978), Chilean politician
- Natalia Pliacam (born 1980), Thai drag performer
- Natalia Podolskaya (born 1982), Belarusian singer
- Natalia Podolskaya (canoeist) (born 1993), Russian canoeist
- Natalia Pogonina (born 1985), Russian chess player
- Natalia Pokas (born 1965), Soviet swimmer
- Natalia Poklonskaya (born 1980), Ukrainian-born Russian lawyer, politician, and diplomat
- Natalia Polenova (born 1975), Russian museum director
- Natalia Polosmak (born 1956), Russian archaeologist
- Natalia Christine Poluakan (born 1985), Indonesian badminton player
- Natalia Poluyanova (born 1981), Russian politician
- Natasha Poly (born 1985), Russian model
- Natalia Ponce de León (born 1980), Colombian campaigner
- Natalia Ponomarchuk (born 1969), Ukrainian orchestral conductor
- Natalia Ponomareva (born 1982), Uzbekistani pair skater
- Natalia Popova (chess player) (born 1976), Belarusian chess player
- Natalia Popova (born 1993), Ukrainian figure skater
- Natalia Popovych (born 1968), Ukrainian politician
- Natalia Potkina (born 1982), Belarusian fashion designer
- Natalia Pouzyreff (born 1961), French politician
- Natália Prekopová (born 1989), Slovak biathlete
- Natalia Prișcepa (born 1989), Moldovan weightlifter
- Natalia Proskurina (born 1990), Russian canoeist
- Natalia Prykhodko (born 1981), Ukrainian politician
- Natalia Przybysz (born 1983), Polish musician
- Natalia Pulido (born 1969), Spanish swimmer
- Natalia Pushkina (1812–1863), wife of Alexander Pushkin
- Natalia Alexandrovna Pushkina (1836–1913), daughter of Alexander Pushkin, Countess of Merenberg
- Natalia Quiñones, Mexican model and beauty pageant titleholder
- Natalia Rachynska (born 1970), Ukrainian football referee
- Natalia Radkiewicz (born 2003), Polish footballer
- Natalia Rahman (born 1982), Australian sport shooter
- Natalia Ramírez (born 1966), Colombian television actress
- Natalia Ramos (born 1999), Spanish footballer
- Natalia Razumovskaya (born 1975), Russian freestyle skier
- Natalia Reva (born 1965), Russian tennis player
- Natalia Revuelta Clews (1925–2015), Cuban socialite
- Natalia Reyes (born 1987), Colombian actress
- Natalia Riffo (born 1971), Chilean politician and psychologist
- Natalia da Rocha, South African actress and director
- Natalia Rodríguez, several people
- Natalia Rogova (born 1995), Russian badminton player
- Natalia Koch Rohde (born 1995), Danish badminton player
- Natalia Rom (born 1950), Russian-born soprano
- Natalia Romaniuta (born 1982), Russian ice dancer
- Natalia Romanova (born 1972), Peruvian volleyball player
- Natalia Romero, several people
- Natalia Roschina (born 1954), Russian swimming coach
- Natalia Roslavleva (1907–1977), Soviet dance historian
- Natalia Rotenberg (born 1981), Russian businesswoman and politician
- Natalia Roubina (born 1984), Cypriot swimmer
- Natalia Rudina (born 1974), Russian singer
- Natalia Rusakova (born 1979), Russian sprinter
- Natalia Russkikh (born 1985), Tajikistani-Russian footballer
- Natalia Rutkowska (born 1991), Polish cyclist
- Natalia Rybczynski, Canadian paleobiologist
- Natalia Rybicka (born 1986), Polish actress
- Natalia Ryzhenkova (born 1972), Belarusian biathlete
- Natalia Ryzhevich (born 1977), Belarusian footballer
- Natalia Sadowska (born 1991), Polish draughts player
- Natalia Saenz (born 1981), Colombian model and television host
- Natalia Safonova (born 1999), Russian rhythmic gymnast
- Natalia Salvador (born 1993), Chilean field hockey player
- Natalia Sánchez, several people
- Natalia Santa (born 1977), Colombian director
- Natalia Saratovtseva (born 1989), Russian-Azerbaijani footballer
- Natália Scherer (born 1985), Brazilian rhythmic gymnast
- Natalia Sedova (1882–1962), Russian marxist
- Natalia Semenova (born 1982), Ukrainian discus thrower
- Natalia Serdán (1875–1938), pioneer of the Mexican revolution
- Natalia Shakhovskaya (1935–2017), Soviet and Russian cellist
- Natalia Shaposhnikova (born 1961), Soviet artistic gymnast
- Natalia Shelikhova (1762–1810), Russian businesswoman
- Natalia Shepelina (born 1981), Russian water polo player
- Natalia Sheppard (born 1984), British fencer
- Natalia Sheremeteva (1714–1771), Russian writer
- Natalia Shestakova (born 1988), Russian former pair skater
- Natalia Shlemova (born 1978), Tajikistani diver
- Natalia Shliakhtenko (born 1987), Russian biathlete
- Natalia Shlyapina (born 1983), Russian footballer
- Natalia Shpiller (1909–1995), Russian opera singer and music educator
- Natalia Shustova, American chemist
- Natalia Sidorowicz (born 1998), Polish biathlete
- Natalia Siedliska (born 1995), German tennis player
- Natalia Silva, several people
- Natalia Sirobaba (born 1985), Ukrainian gymnast
- Natalia Siwiec (born 1983), Polish glamour model
- Natália Šlepecká (born 1983), Slovak freestyle skier
- Natalia Smirnoff (born 1972), Argentine film director
- Natalia Alexandrovna Smirnova (1933–2023), Russian chemical scientist
- Natalia Soboleva (born 1995), Russian snowboarder
- Natalia Soetrisno (born 1976), Indonesian tennis player
- Natalia Sokol (born 1980), Russian activist
- Natalia Sokolovskaya (born 1989), Russian pianist and composer
- Natalia Solodinina (born 1997), Russian acrobatic gymnast
- Natalia Șoșeva (born 1964), Moldovan pharmaceutical executive and politician
- Natalia de la Sota (born 1975), Argentine politician
- Natalia Souto, Argentine politician
- Natalia Stamuli (born 1996), Albanian fashion model
- Natalia Stratulat (born 1987), Moldovan discus thrower
- Natalia Straub (born 1978), German chess player
- Natalia Streignard (born 1970), Venezuelan actress
- Natalia Strelchenko (1976–2015), Norwegian concert pianist
- Natalia Strózik (born 1995), Polish volleyball player
- Natalia Strzałka (born 1997), Polish freestyle wrestler
- Natália Šubrtová (born 1989), Slovak alpine skier
- Natalia Elisante Sulle (born 1988), Tanzanian long-distance runner
- Natalia Suvorova (born 1995), Russian BMX cyclist
- Natalia Szroeder (born 1995), Polish singer and TV presenter
- Natalia Romero Talguia (born 1985), Chilean politician
- Natalia Tanner (1922–2018), American physician
- Natalia Tena (born 1984), British actress
- Natalia Theodoridou, Greek writer
- Natalia Titorenko (born 1951), Soviet and Russian chess player
- Natalia Todorovschi (1931–2007), Romanian volleyball player
- Natalia Toledo (born 1968), Mexican poet
- Natalia Toledo (athlete) (born 1972), Paraguayan long jumper
- Natalia Tolstaya (1943–2010), Russian writer and translator
- Natalia Tomilova (born 1977), Russian ski-orienteer
- Natalia Toro, American particle physicist
- Natalia Trayanova, professor of biomedical engineering
- Natalia Troitskaya (1951–2006), Russian opera singer
- Natalia Vladimirovna Trouhanowa (1885–1956), French ballet dancer of Ukrainian origin
- Natalia Tułasiewicz (1906–1945), Polish teacher, rebel, and Roman Catholic martyr
- Natalia Tychler (born 1973), South African fencer
- Natália Pedro da Costa Umbelina Neto (born 1951), São Toméan diplomat
- Natalia Utina (1841–1913), Russian revolutionary
- Natalia Uzhviy (1898–1986), Ukrainian actress
- Natália do Vale (born 1953), Brazilian actress
- Natalia Valeeva (born 1969), Italian archer
- Natalia Valentín (born 1989), Puerto Rican volleyball player
- Natalia Valenzuela (born 1989), Colombian beauty pageant titleholder
- Natalia Valevska (born 1981), Ukrainian singer and songwriter
- Natalia Valevskaya (fashion designer), Russian Haute Couture fashion designer and art historian
- Natalia Verbeke (born 1975), Argentine-Spanish actress
- Natalia Veselnitskaya (born 1975), Russian lawyer
- Natalia Veselova (born 1975), Ukrainian politician
- Natalia Vía Dufresne (born 1973), Spanish sailor
- Natalia Vico (born 1992), Argentine handball player
- Natalia Vieru (born 1989), Moldavian-born Russian basketball player
- Natalia Vikhlyantseva (born 1997), Russian tennis player
- Natalia Villa (born 1979), Argentine politician
- Natalia Villarreal (born 1998), Mexican footballer
- Natalia Vinogradova (born 1993), Russian sport shooter
- Natalia Vinyukova (born 1989), Russian handball player
- Natalia Vlaschenko (born 1960), Ukrainian journalist and theatrologist
- Natalia Vodianova (born 1982), Russian model
- Natalia Vodopyanova (born 1981), Russian basketball player
- Natalia Vorobieva (born 1991), Russian wrestler
- Natalia Voskobovich (born 1993), Belarusian footballer
- Natalia Warner (born 1991), British actress
- Natalia Wojtuściszyn (born 1993), Polish luger
- Natalia Wörner (born 1967), German actress
- Natalia Wróbel (born 2003), Polish footballer
- Natalia Yakovenko (born 1942), Ukrainian historian
- Natalia Yakushenko (born 1972), Ukrainian luger
- Natalia Yanchak, Canadian musician and writer
- Natalia Ye-Granda (born 2008), American rhythmic gymnast
- Natalia Yukhareva (born 1975), Russian judoka
- Natalia Yurchenko (born 1965), Soviet artistic gymnast
- Natalia Zabala (born 1983), Spanish beauty pageant titleholder
- Natalia Zabala Chacur (born 1978), Argentine politician
- Natalia Zabiiako (born 1994), Russian-Estonian figure skater
- Natalia Zabila (1903–1985), Ukrainian poet and children's writer
- Natalia Zagryazhskaya (1747–1837), Russian philanthropist
- Natalia Zamilska (born 1989), Polish musician
- Natalia Zamora (born 1987), Mexican sport shooter
- Natalia Zaracho (born 1989), Argentine politician
- Natalia Zarembina (1895–1973), Polish writer
- Natalia Zdebskaya (born 1986), Ukrainian chess player
- Natalia Zhadanova (born 1981), Ukrainian rhythmic gymnast
- Natalia Zhukova (born 1979), Ukrainian chess grandmaster
- Natalia Ziganshina (born 1985), Russian artistic gymnast
- Natalia Zotov (1942–2012), New Zealand cosmologist and nun
- Natalia Zubarevich (born 1954), Russian economic geographer
- Natalia Zukerman (born 1975), American musician
- Natalia Zuyeva (born 1988), Russian rhythmic gymnast
- Natalia Zvereva (born 1970), Russian economist

== Fictional characters ==
- Natalia, the protagonist of The Time of the Doves by Mercè Rodoreda
- Natalia Arlovskaya, the given name for the national personification of Belarus from the anime series Hetalia: Axis Powers
- Natalia Arron in the young adult novel Three Dark Crowns by Kendare Blake
- Natalia Boa Vista in CSI: Miami
- Natalia Dragomiroff in Agatha Christie's novel Murder on the Orient Express
- Natalia Kaminski in the light novel and anime Fate/Zero
- Natalia Kowalski, character in the video game Lego City Undercover
- Natalia Luzu Kimlasca Lanvaldear in the video game Tales of the Abyss
- Natalia Romanova in the Marvel universe, alias Natasha Romanoff and Black Widow
- Natalia "Natasha" Rostova in War and Peace
- Natalia Shulmenski in Laurie Halse Anderson's novel Prom
- Natalia Alexander in the Mexican teen drama Control Z
- Natalia "Talia", the fiancée of Mischa Bachinski from the musical Ride the Cyclone
- Natalia "Naty" Vidal in the Disney Channel Latin America series Violetta

== See also ==
- Natacha
- Natalee
- Natalya
- Nataliya
