= Lengauer =

Lengauer a surname. Notable people with the surname include:

- Anton Lengauer-Stockner (born 1961), Austrian biathlete
- Natalia Lengauer (1908–1997), Ukrainian ambulance doctor
- Thomas Lengauer (born 1952), German computer scientist and computational biologist

== See also ==
- Lengauer-Tarjan's algorithm
