= Cabrerizo =

Cabrerizo is a Spanish language surname meaning "goatherd". It may refer to:

- Bruno Cabrerizo (born 1979), Brazilian football player, model and actor
- Cristian Cabrerizo (born 1993), better known as Cris Cab, American singer-songwriter and musician
- Natalia Cabrerizo (born 1980), Spanish swimmer

== See also ==
- Cabrerizos, a village and municipality in Castile-Leon, Spain
