= Emilie Savage-Smith =

American-British historian of science (born 1941)

Emilie Savage-Smith FBA (born 20 August 1941) is an American-British historian of science known for her work on science in the medieval Islamic world and medicine in the medieval Islamic world.

== Education and career ==
Savage-Smith was born on 20 August 1941, in the US, and became a dual citizen of the UK and US in 2003. She was an undergraduate at DePauw University, graduating in 1962, and completed her Ph.D. in 1969 at the University of Wisconsin–Madison. Her doctoral dissertation, Galen on Nerves, Veins and Arteries, was a critical edition of book 16 of Galen's De usu partium corporis humani, including a translation from the Arabic edition of Hunayn ibn Ishaq.

She is retired as Professor of the History of Islamic Science at the University of Oxford, where she continues to be Fellow Archivist of St Cross College, Oxford and a senior research consultant for the Bodleian Library. She is the president of the Society for the History of Medieval Technology and Science. Before moving to the Oriental Institute at the University of Oxford she was a researcher at the University of California, Los Angeles, in the Gustave E. von Grunebaum Center for Near Eastern Studies and in the Medical History Division of the Department of Anatomy.

== Books ==
Savage-Smith is the author or coauthor of:

- Lost Maps of the Caliphs: Drawing the World in Eleventh-Century Cairo (with Yossef Rapoport, University of Chicago Press, 2018)
- Medieval Islamic Medicine (with Peter E. Pormann, Edinburgh University Press, 2007)
- Medieval Views of the Cosmos (with Evelyn Edson, Bodleian Library, 2004)
- Science, Tools & Magic. (two volumes) (with F. R. Maddison, Oxford University Press, 1997)
- Islamicate Celestial Globes: Their History, Construction, and Use (Smithsonian Institution Press, 1985)
- Islamic Geomancy and a Thirteenth-Century Divinatory Device (with M. B. Smith, Undena Press, 1980)

Additionally, she has contributed as an editor or translator to multiple other books including critical editions of works from the medieval Islamic world, edited volumes, and catalogues of collections.

== Recognition ==
Savage-Smith was named a Fellow of the British Academy in 2010. She became a corresponding fellow of the Medieval Academy of America in 2020.

In 2014, DePauw University gave her an honorary doctorate. In 2016, the Scientific Instrument Society chose Savage-Smith as their Gerard Turner Memorial Lecturer and gave her the Turner Medal. A workshop in honour of her career and contributions to the history of Islamic science, Health, Magic and Stars: Workshop on the history of Islamic science, was held at Oxford in 2019.

Her book Medieval Islamic Medicine was one of three 2008 winners of the British-Kuwait Friendship Society Book Prize.
