= Jan Drohojowski =

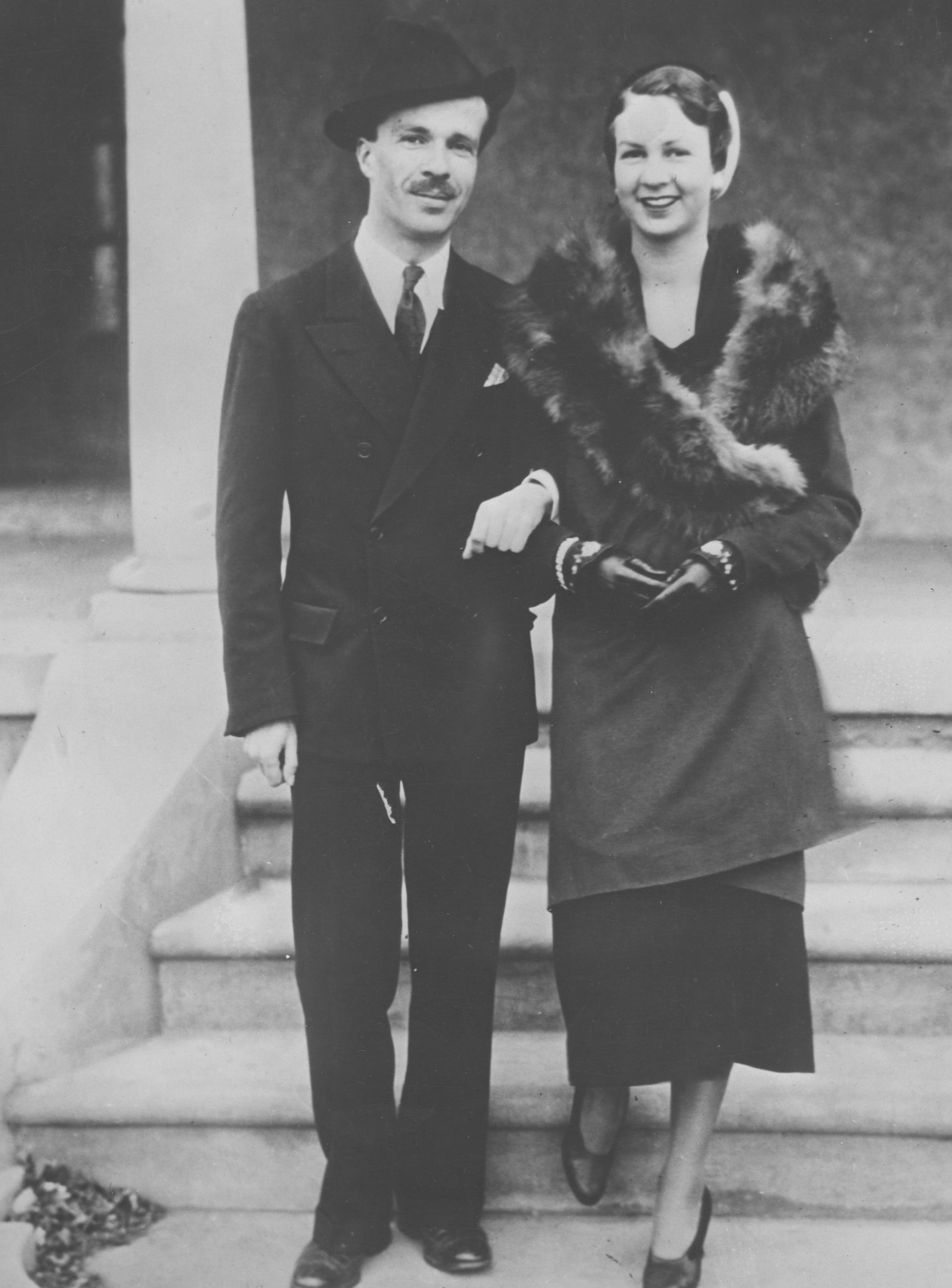
- Jan Drohojowski and his spouse, Katharyn Silva (1931)
- Born: January 27, 1901; Tarnów
- Died: February 1, 1979 (aged 78); Warsaw
- Resting place: Powązki Military Cemetery
- Occupation: diplomat
- Spouse(s): Silva Cornell (since 1930); Natalia Aszkenazy (since ca 1940)
- Children: Katarzyna Maria Drohojowska; Francisco (Pancho) Drohojowski

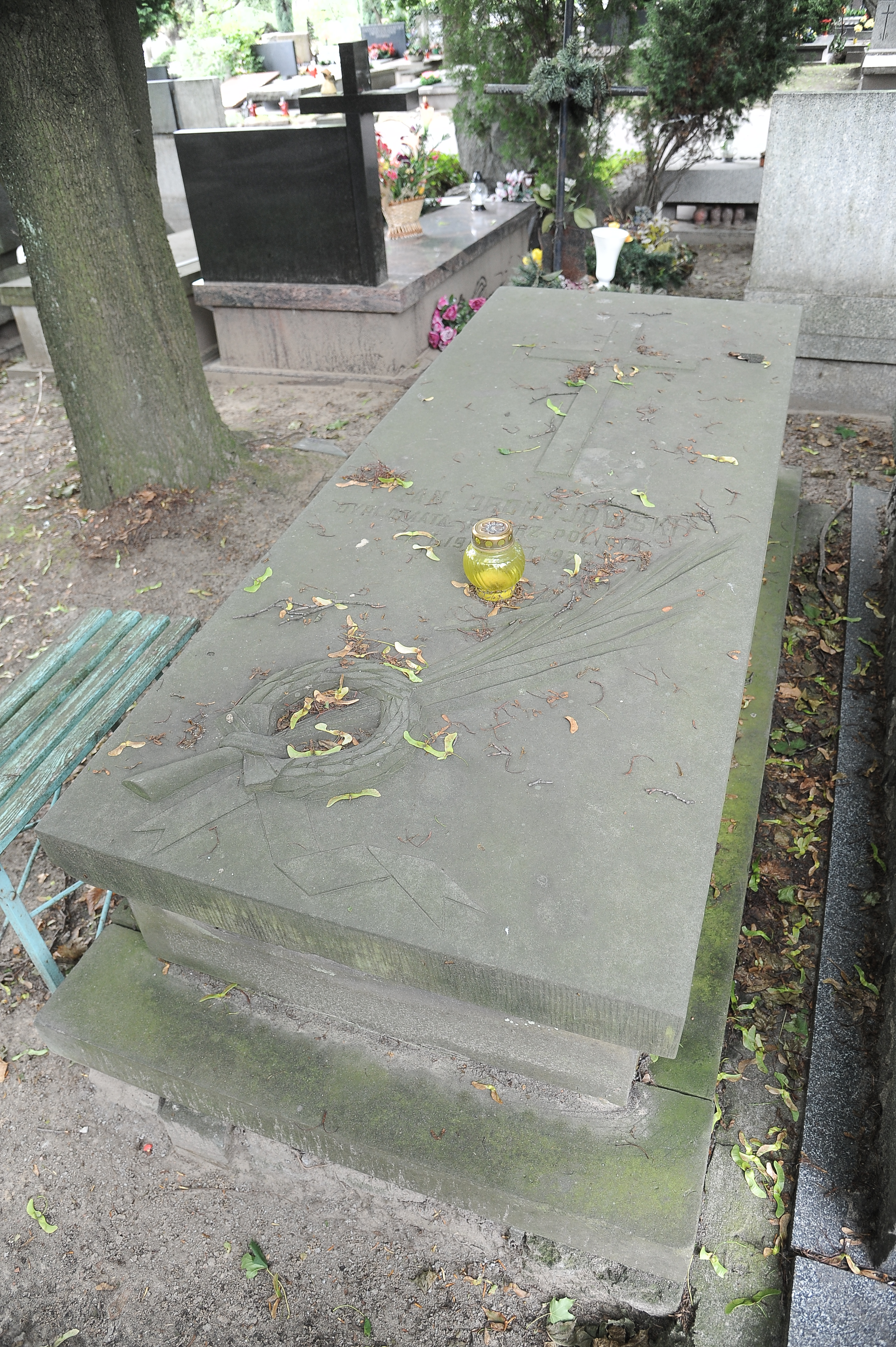
Drohojowski grave at the Powązki Military Cemetery

Jan Drohojowski (1901–1979) was a Polish diplomat for the governments of the Second Polish Republic and later, Polish government in exile and the People's Republic of Poland.

== Biography ==
Born on 27 January 1901 in Tarnów, he began his diplomatic career around early 1920s, but retired following the May Coup (Poland), and emigrated to the United States, where he was a journalist for some Polish-American press.

Following the onset of WWII he became involved with the Polish government in exile, first working in the Polish embassy in the USA. He was Poland's chargé d' affaires to Cuba (1942), a representative to China (1942), a consul in Jerusalem (1943), and following that he became a deputy minister of information and documentation in the government-in-exile until 1944. Following the war he joined the diplomatic service of the communist Polish government, becoming an envoy or an ambassador (sources vary) to Mexico (1945-1951) and Egypt (1952-1952). He was also a representative of Poland to the United Nations. From April 1952 to April 1953 he was a director of the Powszechna Kasa Oszczędności Bank Polski (1952-1953). He received the Order of Polonia Restituta twice (in 1946 and 1951). Following a purge, he was arrested and held until March 1955. He spent the rest of his life as a writer and journalist, publishing several books on Latin America, in addition to his memoirs.

He died on 2 January 1979 in Warsaw.

== Personal life ==
Jan Drohojowski married twice. First around 1930 he married Texaco oil heiress Katharyn Silva Cornell; they had a daughter Katarzyna Maria Drohojowska. They divorced in 1935, with Cornell alleging that Drohojowski "told risque stories...[and] came to lunch in pajamas". Drohojowski requested, but did not receive, alimony from Cornell, "an unusual plea in court annals." Later around 1940 he married his fellow diplomat Natalia Aszkenazy. They had a son, Adam Francisco (Pancho) Drohojowski, born in Mexico in 1947.

== Bibliography ==
- Jana Drohojewskiego wspomnienia dyplomatyczne (1959)
- Abraham Lincoln (1962)
- Meksyk bogów, krzyża i dolarów (1962)
- Indianin prezydentem Meksyku (1964)
- Religie i wierzenia w życiu Ameryki Łacińskiej (1964)
- Róg obfitości (1967)
- Ameryka Łacińska z bliska (1968)
- Polacy w Ameryce (1976)
