= Evelyn Edson =

- Born: November 28, 1940 (age 85); Oklahoma City, US

Academic background
- Education: Swarthmore College; University of Chicago

Academic work
- Discipline: history
- Sub-discipline: medieval studies
- Institutions: University of Chicago; Roosevelt University; Piedmont Virginia Community College
- Main interests: history of cartography
- Notable works: Mapping Time and Space: How Medieval Mapmakers Viewed Their World; Medieval Views of the Cosmos; The World Map, 1300–1492

Evelyn Edson (born November 28, 1940, in Oklahoma City) is an author, medievalist, and professor emerita of history. She is known for her three books on the history of cartography.

== Biography ==
She graduated in 1962 with a B.A. from Swarthmore College. From 1962 to 1964 she taught at Poughkeepsie's Oakwood Friends School and then matriculated as a graduate student at the University of Chicago. There she graduated in 1965 with an M.A. and in 1972 with a Ph.D. From 1966 to 1969 she worked at the University of Chicago as a lecturer in western civilization. At Roosevelt University she was from 1970 to 1971 a visiting assistant professor and from 1971 to 1972 an associate dean in continuing education. She was a professor at Charlottesville's Piedmont Virginia Community College from 1972 to 2006, when she retired as professor emerita.

Edson was from 1986 to 1988 a member of the advisory board for WGBH-TV's western tradition telecourse. In 1999 in England, she spent six months as a Fellow of the Senior Common Room at Merton College, Oxford, where she was sponsored by Sarah Bendall. In November 1999 Edson was appointed to the advisory council of the National Endowment for the Humanities. From 2000 to 2004 she was a council member of the National Council on the Humanities.

Natalia Lozovsky favorably reviewed Edson's 1999 book Mapping Time and Space: How Medieval Mapmakers Viewed Their World, which describe mapmaking in western Europe from the 8th century to the late 13th century. Edson's 2004 book Medieval Views of the Cosmos, coauthored by Emilie Savage-Smith, is a valuable overview of comparative cartography for medieval maps created in the distinct traditions of Christianity and Islam. Edson's 2007 book The World Map, 1300–1492 describes the work of the Italian cartographers of the 14th and 15th centuries and how these cartographers were influenced by the writings of Marco Polo, Odoric of Pordenone, and Sir John Mandeville.

In August 1976 in Charlottesville, she married Andrew "Andy" Austin Wilson. They have a daughter and a son.

== Selected publications ==
=== Articles ===
- Edson, Evelyn (1996). "World maps and Easter tables: Medieval maps in context". Imago Mundi. 48: 25–42. doi:10.1080/03085699608592831.
- Edson, Evelyn (1998). "The 17th international conference on the history of cartography: Report". Imago Mundi. 50: 189–192. doi:10.1080/03085699808592887.
- Bork, Robert; Kann, Andrea, eds. (2008). "Chapter 11. Petrarch's Journey between Two Maps by Evelyn Edson". The Art, Science, and Technology of Medieval Travel. AVISTA Studies in the History of Medieval Technology, Science and Art. Volume 6. Ashgate Publishing. pp. 157–166. ISBN 9780754663072.
- Edson, Evelyn (2010). "The Medieval World View: Contemplating the Mappamundi". History Compass. 8 (6): 503–517. doi:10.1111/j.1478-0542.2010.00676.x.

=== Books ===
- Mapping Time and Space: How Medieval Mapmakers Viewed Their World. British Library. 1999. ISBN 9780712345361.
- with Emilie Savage-Smith, Medieval Views of the Cosmos. Bodleian Library. 2004. ISBN 9781851241842.
- The World Map, 1300–1492: The Persistence of Tradition and Transformation. JHU Press. 15 July 2007. ISBN 9781421404301.
