= Natalia Sánchez =

Natalia Sánchez may refer to:

- Natalia Sánchez (actress) (born 1990), Spanish actress
- Natalia Sánchez (archer) (born 1983), Colombian archer
- Natália Sanchez (born 1988), Brazilian rhythmic gymnast

== See also ==
- Nathalia Sánchez (born 1992), Colombian artistic gymnast
- Natalia (given name)
