= Sergey Arkhipov (chess player) =

Russian chess grandmaster (born 1954)

Personal information
- Born: Sergey Nikolaevich Arkhipov; 23 June 1954 (age 72) Moscow, Soviet Union
- Spouse: Natalia Alekhina

Chess career
- Country: Russia
- Title: Grandmaster (1992)
- FIDE rating: 2443 (July 2026)
- Peak rating: 2560 (July 1984)

Sergey Nikolaevich Arkhipov (born 23 June 1954) is a Russian chess player.

Arkhipov earned the FIDE title of Grandmaster (GM) in 1991. In the mid-1980's, he was living and playing in Hungary. His peak rating was 2560.

== Personal life ==
Arkhipov is married to Natalia Alekhina, who is also a professional chess player with a Woman Grandmaster (WGM) title.
