= Natalia Perkins =

Russian and American physicist

Natalia Borisovna Perkins (also published as N. B. Pustyl'nik) is a Russian and American physicist whose research involves quantum phases of condensed matter, such as quantum spin liquids, both through observation and theoretical analysis. She is a professor of physics at the University of Minnesota.

== Education and career ==
Perkins is originally from Dubna, near Moscow, where both her parents worked as physicists. After graduating from Moscow State University with a degree in physics in 1994, Perkins continued at the university for a 1997 doctorate. Her dissertation, Magnons, magnetic polaritons and magnetostatic waves, was supervised by Moisei Kaganov. Her doctoral research concerned theoretical magnetic quasiparticles that would later be important in spintronics, but she soon shifted her interests, to frustrated magnetism and spin patterns.

From 1997 to 2008 she was listed as a researcher for the Bogoliubov Laboratory of Theoretical Physics of the Joint Institute for Nuclear Research in Dubna. Meanwhile, she was also a postdoctoral researcher in Europe, from 2002 to 2004 at the Laboratori Nazionali di Frascati in Italy, from 2004 to 2006 at the Max Planck Institute for the Physics of Complex Systems in Germany, and from 2006 to 2007 at the Technical University of Braunschweig in Germany.

She began an assistant professorship at the University of Wisconsin–Madison in 2007, and was promoted to associate professor in 2013. In 2014, she moved to her present position at the University of Minnesota, and in 2019 she was promoted to full professor. She visited the Technical University of Munich in 2022, under a Hans Fischer Senior Fellowship.

== Recognition ==
Perkins was named as a Fellow of the American Physical Society (APS) in 2016, after a nomination from the APS Division of Condensed Matter Physics, "for theoretical studies of the low-energy behavior of strongly correlated electron systems that exhibit an interplay of orbital and spin degrees of freedom". In 2017, the Perimeter Institute named her as an Emmy Noether Fellow.
