= Natália Kodajová =

Slovak swimmer

Personal information
- Born: 21 July 1968 (age 57) Žilina, Czechoslovakia

Sport
- Sport: Swimming

Natália Kodajová (born 21 July 1968) is a Slovak swimmer. She competed in two events at the 1996 Summer Olympics.
