= Natalia Ivanova =

Natalia, Natalya or Nataliya Ivanova may refer to:

- Natalia Ivanova (taekwondo) (born 1971), Russian Olympic taekwondo competitor and medalist
- Natalya Ivanova (hurdler) (born 1981), Russian hurdler
- Natalia Ivanova (wrestler) (born 1969), Russian and Tajikistani sport wrestler
- Natalia Ivanova (sailor), Russian Olympic sailor and medalist
- Natalia Ivanova (footballer) (born 1979), Kazakhstani footballer
