= Natalia Lozovsky =

Medieval historian

Natalia Lozovsky is a medievalist and translator, whose research focuses on science and geography in the medieval period. She has also demonstrated how ninth and tenth century works on geography, often draw on other literary traditions, such as exegesis. She also writes on how classical knowledge of geography was received by medieval Christian scholarship. She has worked on the lives and writings of Isidore of Seville, Dicuil, Ravenna Cosmographer and Orosius, amongst others.

In 2011 she was appointed a research associate at the Office for the History of Science and Technology at University of California, Berkeley. She has an MA from Moscow University and a PhD from the University of Colorado.

== Reception ==
In February 2001, J Francis Watson wrote that "The Earth is Our Book": Geographical Knowledge in the Latin West Ca. 400-1000 broke "new ground in the fields of medieval studies and history of science". Evelyn Edson described the work as "valuable contribution to the understanding of the design and function of later mappae mundi".

== Selected works ==
- "The Earth is Our Book": Geographical Knowledge in the Latin West Ca. 400-1000 (University of Michigan, 2000)
- Lozovsky, Natalia. "Roman geography and ethnography in the Carolingian empire." Speculum 81.2 (2006): 325-364
- Lozovsky, N. (2008). "Maps And Panegyrics: Roman Geo-Ethnographical Rhetoric In Late Antiquity And The Middle Ages". In Cartography in Antiquity and the Middle Ages. Leiden, The Netherlands: Brill.
- Lozovsky N. Telling a new story of pre-modern geography: Challenges and rewards. Dialogues in Human Geography. 2011;1(2):178-182.
