= Natalia Perepechina =

Russian footballer (born 1990)

Personal information
- Date of birth: 3 February 1990 (age 36)
- Place of birth: Russia,
- Height: 1.64 m (5 ft 5 in)
- Position: Midfielder

Team information
- Current team: Ryazan-VDV
- Number: 32

Senior career*
Years	Team	Apps	(Gls)
2012–2017	Donchanka Azov	46	(3)
2018	Kubanochka	14	(1)
2019–	Ryazan-VDV	44	(5)

International career^{‡}
	Russia	4	(0)
- * Club domestic league appearances and goals as of 28 August 2020 (UTC) ‡ National team caps and goals as of 23:51, 31 August 2019 (UTC)

Natalia Perepechina (born 3 February 1990) is a Russian footballer who plays for Ryazan-VDV as a midfielder and has appeared for the Russia women's national team.

== Career ==
Perepechina has been capped for the Russia national team, appearing for the team during the UEFA Women's Euro 2021 qualifying cycle.
