= Natalia Potkina =

Belarusian fashion designer (born 1982)

- Born: March 14, 1982; Minsk
- Citizenship: Belarus
- Education: Institute of Modern Knowledge named after M.Shirokov
- Occupation: Fashion designer
- Label: Natasha Potkina
- Parent(s): Valery Potkin, Elvira Potkina
- Website: http://potkina.com/

Natalia Potkina (Belarusian: Наталля Поткіна, Russian: Наталия Поткина; born March 14, 1982, Minsk, Republic of Belarus) is a Belarusian fashion designer, the head of «Natasha Potkina's Fashion House», and the creator of Natasha Potkina's brand of designer clothes. She is also the winner and Laureate of the Belarusian and international festivals and contests of fashion: «White Amphora», «Fashion Mill», «Admiralty Needle», «Jeans-Russia» and others.

== Biography ==
Natasha created her first collection of clothes under the name «Birdies of Paradise» when she was a student of the 10th form. The collection was shown to her schoolmates at her graduation party. In 2001, she participated at the festival of vanguard fashion designers, «Mamont», where she won a juried prize. The same year, at the International contest of fashion designers «White Amphora» in Vitebsk, her collection «Safari Maiden Voyage» won the first award in the nomination «Tatiana Day». An outfit from her first collection, «Safari», was purchased by the singer Natalia Podolskaya. Podolskaya wore this outfit when she performed at the Belarusian song contest «At Intersections of Europe».

In 2003, she graduated from the Minsk Institute of Modern Knowledge named after A.M. Shirokov (her specialty being design and garment construction).

In 2009, Natasha Potkina arranged a display of her collection «Gravitation» at the National Academic Opera and Ballet Theater in Minsk. This was one of the first large-scale fashion shows in Minsk.

In 2012, Natasha Potkina opened her own design agency, which designs clothing that is produced in factories in Belarus and other CIS countries.

In April 2016, Natasha Potkina and her Turkish partners opened a drapery, skins, furs and accessories store called «House of Fashion Textiles».

In October of the same year Natasha opened a school of cutting and sewing fabric with Karatova Oksana Nikolaevna (a design teacher and author of the book «Designing and Modelling of Clothes»). Here they teach people how to create clothes.

As of 2016, her clients include Natalia Podolskaya, Angelica Agurbash, Polina Smolova, Vera Karetnikova, Gyunesh, Hera, Iskui Abalyan and many others. Natasha also helps curate the images of both youth and adult Eurovision performers.

== Contests and awards ==
- Winner of the festival of vanguard art «Mammoth 2001», Minsk;
- Winner of the 1st award of the contest of fashion designers «White amphora 2001», Vitebsk;
- Winner of the fashion festival «Mill of Fashion 2002», Minsk,
- Finalist of the contest of fashion designers «The Admiralty Needle 2002», Saint-Petersburg
- Winner of the 3rd awards of the art festival «Three Moon - 2003», Minsk;
- Winner of the All-Russian contest «Jeans-Russia 2004», 2nd place, Moscow;
- Participant of a fashion show of Belarusian designers in the Russian House, Berlin;
- Participant in opening the art exhibition, «March Cats 2005», in Palace of Arts, Minsk;
- Winner of fashion festival «Mill of Fashion 2005», Minsk;
- Finalist of fashion festival «Assembly of Fashion», Moscow;
- Participant in opening art exhibition «March cats 2006», Palace of Arts, Minsk;
- Winner of the «Belarus Press Photo 2010» project in the nomination «Fashion photo»;
- Participant of Belarus Fashion Week

== Collections ==
- 2001 «Topsy turvy» and «Electro-cutter of Knots», winner of the festival of vanguard art «Mammoth 2001», Minsk
- 2001 «Safari first class», first place in the fashion design contest «White Amphora», Vitebsk
- 2002 «Interval of Indifference», winner of the fashion festival «Mill of Fashion 2002», Minsk, finalist of the fashion design contest «Admiralty Needle 2002», Saint-Petersburg
- 2003 «El Caprichcho», diploma collection, 3rd place at the festival of art «Three Moon», Minsk
- 2004 «Damn it!». Winner of the All-Russian contest «Jeans-Russia 2004", 2nd place Moscow; Winner of the fashion festival «Mill of Fashion of 2004», Minsk; Participant of the fashion show of Belarusian designers in the Russian House, Berlin; Participant in opening the art exhibition «March Cats 2005», Palace of Arts, Minsk
- 2005 «Trunk», Winner of the fashion festival «Mill of Fashion 2005”, Minsk; Finalist of the fashion festival «Assembly of Fashion», Moscow; Participant in opening the art exhibition, «March Cats 2006», in Palace of Arts, Minsk
- 2006 «Wasabi», collection presentation during a Fashion week in Minsk in the Belarusian Center of Fashion, November 17, 2006
- 2009 «Gravitation», collection presentation at National Academic Opera and Ballet Theater, March 19, 2009; collection presentation in «Titan club”, November 27, 2009; winner of best advertising photo of her collection «Belarus Press Photo 2010», in the Fashion Photo category.

== Family ==
Natalia Potkina was born to a family of builders. Natalia's father, Potkin Valery Aleksandrovich, is a construction figure in Belarus, founding and serving as director of his company, Elvira.

Natasha Potkina's children, her son Lev and her daughter Evelina, are winners of the contest Little Miss Universe and Little Mr. of the World in Turkey (Little Miss of the Universe World 2014 & Little Mister of the World 2014).
