= Natalia Maree Belting =

American author and academic (1915–1997)

Natalia Maree Belting (July 11, 1915 – December 17, 1997) was an American author. She was also a professor and researched Native American history in Illinois. Her book The Sun Is a Golden Earring was a Caldecott Medal honor book in 1962.

== Personal life and education ==
Belting was born in Oskaloosa, Iowa, on July 11, 1915. She wrote a book when she was six years old. She attended and graduated from the University of Illinois Urbana-Champaign with a bachelor's degree in journalism. Belting continued her education at the same university, receiving a master's degree and Ph.D. in American history in 1940. Belting died on December 17, 1997.

== Career ==
Belting became a history professor at the same university in 1942, and she later worked as an associate professor beginning in 1973. She was a full professor upon retirement in 1985. From 1996 to 1997, Belting was a professor emerita. Her research focused on how North America was colonized by the French, along with the Native Americans of Illinois. Two of her books were based on that research: the children's book Pierre of Kaskaskia and the book In Enemy Hands. Two of her stories, "Indy and Mr. Lincoln" and "Verity Mullens and the Indian," were retellings from history. Belting wrote her own adaptations of myths and folktales, and those books were part of her over twenty stories for children. She wrote a weekly column named Illinois Past which ran in Illinois newspapers, including the Champaign News-Gazette. Belting wrote Kaskaskia under the French Regime based on her research on the Kaskaskia Manuscripts. The Kaskaskia Manuscripts comprise over 6,000 documents, mostly of French records from their Illinois colony, that date from 1708 to 1816.

== Reception ==
Belting was recognized in 1979 by the Champaign County Arts and Humanities Council for "distinguished contributions to the arts in Illinois." Also in 1979, Belting was the named Author of the Year in Illinois by the Association of Teachers of English. Her book The Sun Is a Golden Earring was a Caldecott Medal honor book in 1962.

Kirkus Reviews said of Moon Was Tired of Walking on Air that "Belting's language is spare, rhythmic, and resonant, while Hillenbrand's powerful dark-toned art conveys a sense of primeval mystery." Widnes Weekly News said that King Solomon's Cat is "a charming selection of feline folk tales from around the world."
