= Natalia Strózik =

Polish volleyball player (born 1995)

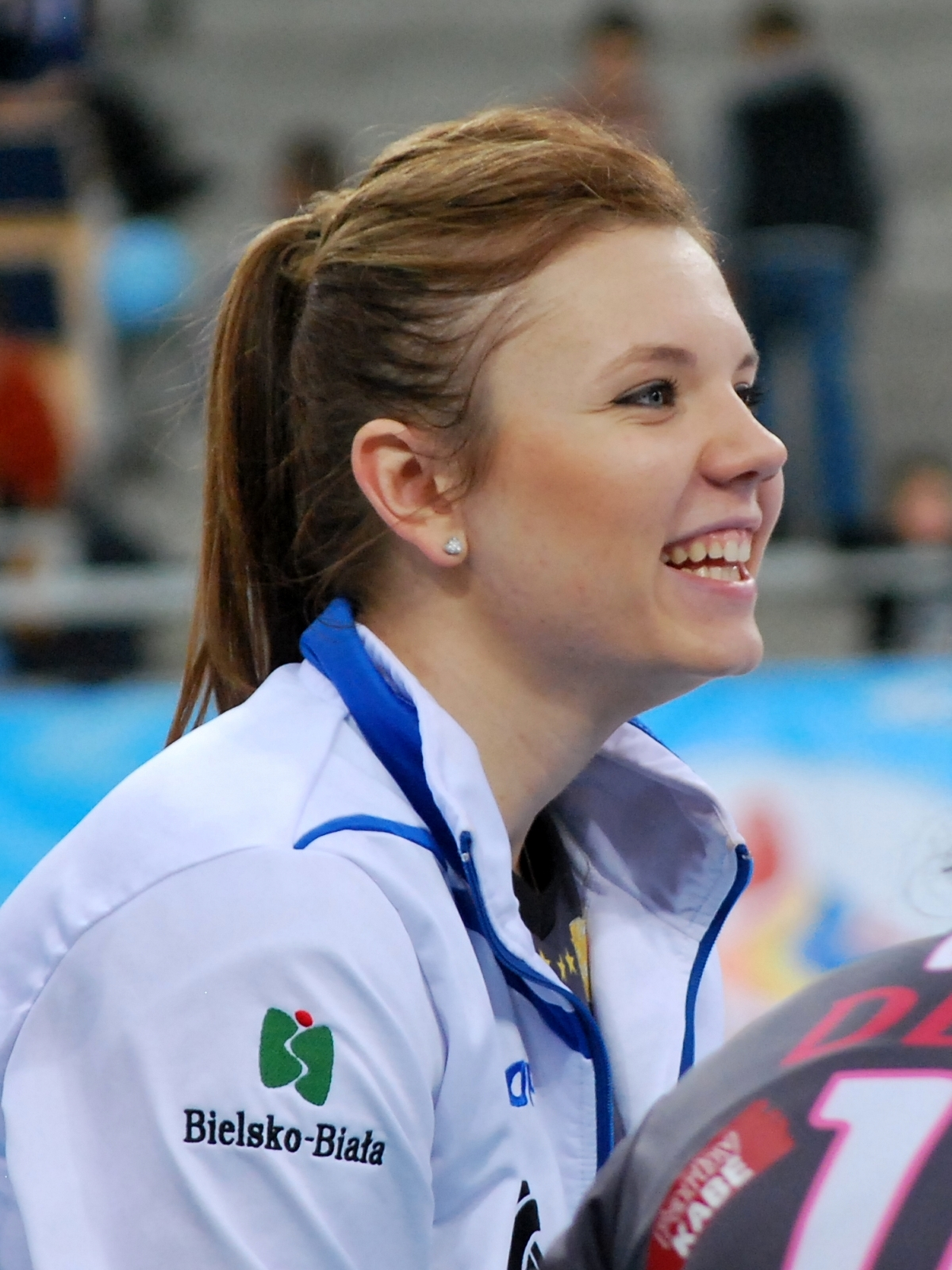
Strózik in 2013

Natalia Strózik (born 23 August 1995) is a Polish volleyball player. She plays for Budowlani Łódź in the Orlen Liga.
