= Natalia Nowakowska =

Historian and academic (born 1977)

Professor Natalia Nowakowska
- Born: Natalia Magdalena Nowakowska; 8 June 1977 (age 49); London, United Kingdom
- Occupations: Historian and academic
- Title: Professor of European History
- Spouse: Nick Kerigan

Academic background
- Education: Lincoln College, Oxford
- Thesis: Papacy and piety in the career of Cardinal Fryderyk Jagiellon, Prince of Poland, 1468-1503 (2003)
- Doctoral advisor: Nicholas Davidson

Academic work
- Discipline: History
- Sub-discipline: Late Middle Ages; Renaissance; History of Poland during the Jagiellonian dynasty; Cultural history; Global history; Political history; History of Christianity
- Institutions: King's College London; University College, Oxford; Somerville College, Oxford

Natalia Magdalena Nowakowska (born 8 June 1977) is an English historian of late medieval and Renaissance Europe with a particular interest in the Kingdom of Poland. She is Professor of European History at the University of Oxford and Fellow and Tutor in History at Somerville College.

== Academic career ==
Nowakowska grew up in the Polish diaspora community which formed in London after the Second World War. She read History at Lincoln College, Oxford, matriculating in 1995. After graduating she briefly worked in social policy research before returning to Lincoln College to work on her doctorate on the life and career of Cardinal Fryderyk Jagiellon, which she completed in 2003. Her doctoral supervisor was Nicholas Davidson.

Nowakowska then took up a one-year Postdoctoral Research Fellowship at King's College London before joining University College, Oxford as a Junior Research Fellow in October 2005. In 2006 she was elected to a Tutorial Fellowship in History at Somerville College. In October 2019 Nowakowska was awarded the Title of Distinction of Professor of European History by the University of Oxford. She has previously served on the governing board of the university's Faculty of History.

=== Research ===
Nowakowska's first monograph, based on her doctoral research, was published by Ashgate in 2007. For the book Nowakowska was named co-winner of the Association for Slavic, East European, and Eurasian Studies' Kulczycki Book Prize in Polish Studies alongside Geneviève Zubrzycki. A Polish translation of the book was published in 2011.

In 2012 Nowakowska was awarded a €1.4 million European Research Council Starting Grant to undertake an international project entitled "The Jagiellonians: Dynasty, Identity and Memory in Central Europe". She and her team of five postdoctoral researchers analysed the cultural memory of the Jagiellonian dynasty, producing a 2018 public exhibition at the Bodleian Library and a series of essays and monographs from this research. Nowakowska's edited collection, Remembering the Jagiellonians, was published by Routledge in 2018.

In 2018 Nowakowska's study of the early Reformation in Poland, King Sigismund of Poland and Martin Luther: The Reformation Before Confessionalization, was published by Oxford University Press. The book won a total of four prizes, including a second Kulczycki Book Prize and the Gerald Strauss Prize awarded by the Sixteenth Century Society for the best book published in the field of German Reformation history. Her research for the book was supported by a British Academy Mid-Career Fellowship.

In February 2022, Nowakowska gave the Ilchester Lecture at Oxford's Faculty of Medieval and Modern Languages on the topic 'From Tribe to Dynasty? Globalizing the Jagiellonians of Central Europe (1377–1596)'.

Nowakowska is currently working on a new global history of the Jagiellonian dynasty.

=== Media work ===
Nowakowska has contributed to two blogs related to the discipline of history: one, Somerville Historian, explores teaching and writing history at the University of Oxford and was begun in 2010; the other, History Monograph, documented Nowakowska's process of researching and writing a history book during the year of her British Academy Mid-Career Fellowship (2012–13).

In 2022 Nowakowska appeared as an interviewee in the BBC Radio 4 series The Invention of Poland hosted by Misha Glenny. In 2024 she was interviewed for another Radio 4 serial, The Reinvention of Poland, hosted by Anne McElvoy. She has also appeared as a guest in podcasts by the Historical Association and BBC History exploring the history of late medieval and early modern Poland and Lithuania and the role of the Jagiellonians in shaping central Europe during these periods. In 2026 she recorded a travel guide to Kraków for History Extra's History's Greatest Cities podcast.

== Personal life ==
Nowakowska is married to Nick Kerigan.

== Bibliography ==
=== Books ===
- Church, State and Dynasty in Renaissance Poland: The Career of Cardinal Fryderyk Jagiellon (1486-1503) (Aldershot: Ashgate Publishing, 2007)
- King Sigismund of Poland and Martin Luther: The Reformation Before Confessionalization (Oxford: Oxford University Press, 2018)
- Remembering the Jagiellonians (editor; London: Routledge, 2018)

=== Book chapters ===
- 'Lamenting the Church? Bishop Andrzej Kyrzcki and Early Reformation Polemic', in Almut Suerbaum, George Southcombe and Benjamin Thompson, eds., Polemic: Language as Violence in Medieval and Early Modern Discourse (Farnham: Ashgate, 2015), pp. 223–236
- 'Reform Before Reform? Religious Currents in Central Europe, c. 1500', in Howard Louthan and Graeme Murdock, eds., A Companion to the Reformation in Central Europe (Leiden and Boston: Brill Publishing, 2015), pp. 121–143
- 'An Ambiguous Golden Age: The Jagiellonians in Polish Memory and Historical Consciousness', in Natalia Nowakowska, ed., Remembering the Jagiellonians (London: Routledge, 2018), pp. 49–70
- 'Rioting Blacksmiths and Jewish Women: Pillarised Reformation Memory in Early Modern Poland', in Brian Cummings, Ceri Law, Karis Riley and Alexandra Walsham, eds., Remembering the Reformation (Abingdon and New York: Routledge, 2020), pp. 118–135

=== Journal articles ===
- 'From Strassburg to Trent: Bishops, Printing and Liturgical Reform in the Fifteenth Century', Past & Present 213 (2011), pp. 3–39
- 'Forgetting Lutheranism: Historians and the Early Reformation in Poland (1517-1548)', Church History and Religious Culture 92:2-3 (2012), pp. 281–303
- 'High Clergy and Printers: Anti-Reformation Polemic in the Kingdom of Poland, 1520-36', Historical Research 87:235 (2014), pp. 43–64
- 'What's in a Word? The Etymology and Historiography of Dynasty - Renaissance Europe and Beyond', Global Intellectual History 7:3 (2022), pp. 453–474
