= Natalia Silva =

Natalia Silva may refer to:

- Natália Silva (gymnast) (1927–1958), Portuguese gymnast
- Natália Falavigna da Silva (born 1984), Brazilian taekwondo athlete
- Natália Silva (fighter) (born 1997), Brazilian mixed martial artist
