= Natalia Bobro =

Ukrainian entrepreneur and scientist

- Наталія Сергіївна Бобро
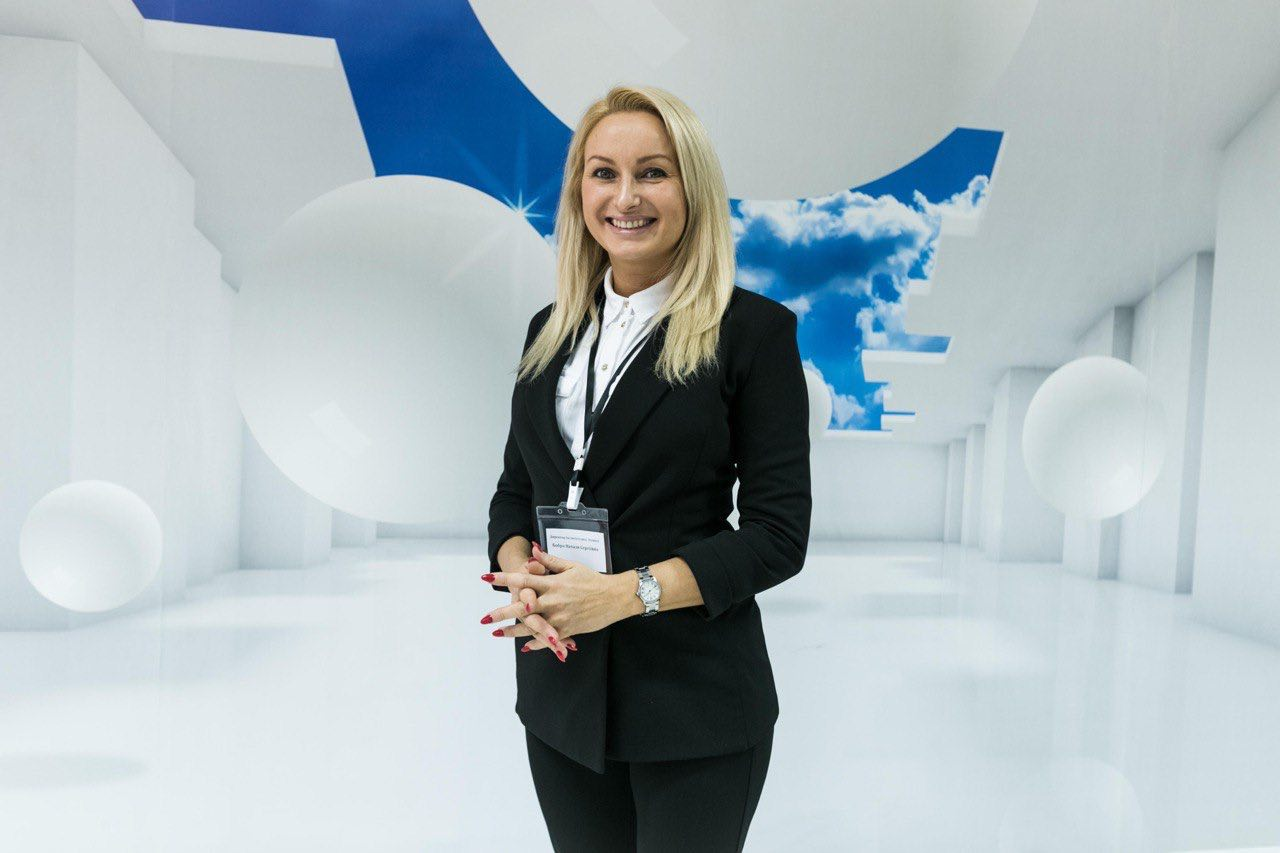
- Born: August 8, 1984 (age 42); Kharkiv, Ukraine
- Education: Kharkiv State Academy of Culture, V. N. Karazin Kharkiv National University, Kyiv National University of Culture and Arts, European University
- Occupations: Entrepreneur, scientist

Natalia Sergiivna Bobro (Ukrainian: Наталія Сергіївна Бобро; born August 8, 1984, Kharkiv, Ukraine) is a Ukrainian entrepreneur, scientist, and director of the Digital Department at the European University. She is also the CEO and founder of Edutechmant, ETM Global, and Release Education. Bobro leads the Noosphere Laboratory and is a member of the expert group at the Ministry of Education and Science of Ukraine, working on amendments to the Law of Ukraine on Extracurricular Education.

== Early life and education ==
Natalia Bobro was born on August 8, 1984, in Kharkiv, Ukraine. In 2000, Bobro enrolled at the Faculty of Economics at the V.N. Karazin Kharkiv National University, majoring in Organizational Management. Simultaneously, she studied Modern Choreography at the Kharkiv State Academy of Culture. While pursuing higher education, she led the dance ensemble "Mriya" (Fantasy).

In 2006, she continued her studies at Kyiv National University of Culture and Arts, graduating in 2007 with a master's degree in Directing and Choreography. In 2017, Bobro attended the European University, earning a Ph.D. in economics and pursuing postdoctoral research.

In 2022, she began studying for a master's degree in management at WSM University in Poland, while simultaneously studying Computer Science and Marketing at the European University.

== Career ==
=== European University and WSB University ===
From 2011 Natalia Bobro works at the European University. In 2011, she initiated the creation of the Institute of Show Business at the university. Since 2018, she has held the position of Director of the Digital Department. In 2022, she became the head of the Noosphere Laboratory for the study of the Human Brain at the university. Bobro also is the chief operating officer at Academia WSB University.

=== ETM and Release Education ===
In 2007, Natalia Bobro founded the company ETM, which specializes in consulting, digital marketing (Edutechmant), business process automation (ETM CRM), and researching innovative technologies (ETM Global). The same year, she established the development studio Release Education. In 2010, she opened the Release Academy in Malta, followed by the Release Dance Complex across the Sport Life fitness centers network in Ukraine in 2011.

From 2007 to 2019, Bobro was the CEO of Release Education, where she established a network of centers and implemented a franchise model. The Release brand received recognition from the Effie Awards. In 2015, she founded the "Mr. Leader" kindergarten. In 2018, she became a partner at Novopecherska School, where she also established a branch of Release Education.

=== NooLab & AI Laboratory ===
NooLab & AI is a scientific center specializing in the study of the noosphere and the development of artificial intelligence. The laboratory's primary goal is to explore the development of consciousness and the impact of cutting-edge technologies on society. The main areas of work include human-computer interaction, artificial intelligence technologies, digital ethics, and scientific forecasting. The noosphere, a concept described by the Ukrainian scientist Volodymyr Vernadsky, envisions the biosphere transitioning to a new state under the influence of human intelligence.

The laboratory strives to create a "new world" with "new people" by developing the concept of an "intellectual personality," which utilizes technologies for long-term planning and the development of its potential. The laboratory's work emphasizes a special focus on neural networks and forecasting as tools for shaping the society of the future.

The laboratory organizes educational events and conferences, including participation in Davos and collaboration with other scientific communities. Additionally, it supports students and researchers by offering opportunities for research and internships, fostering the development of digital education and innovation. The director of the laboratory is Nataliya Sergiivna Bobro, the Director of the Digital Department at the European University.
