= Natalia Panchenko =

Polish-Ukrainian activist

Natalia Mykolaivna Panchenko
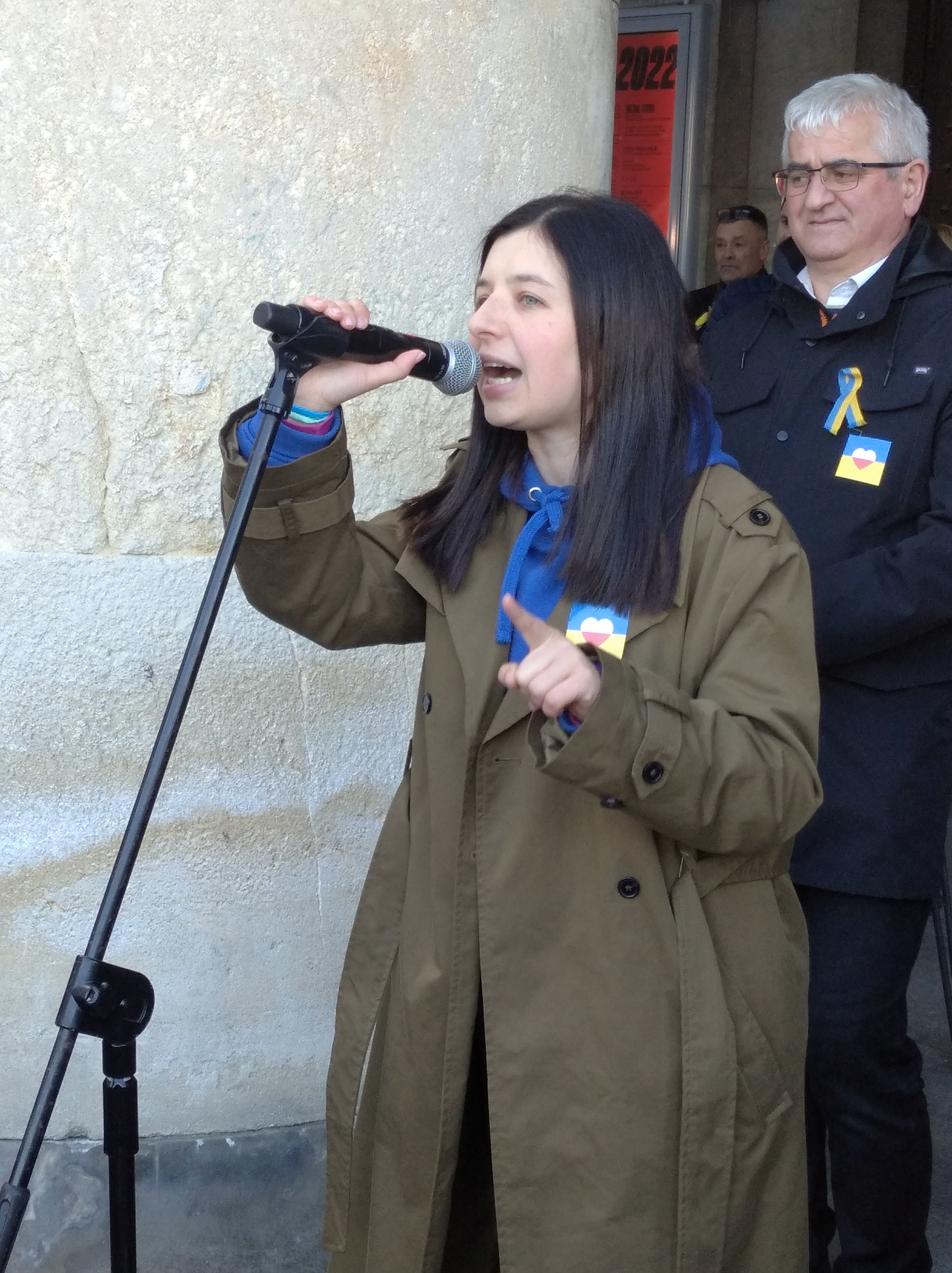
- Born: September 23, 1988 (age 38); Tarasivka village, Zinkivskyi district, Poltava region, Ukrainian SSR
- Education: Warsaw University of Natural Sciences
- Occupations: economist, manager

Natalia Mykolaivna Panchenko (born September 27, 1988, Tarasivka village, Zinkivskyi district, Poltava region, Ukrainian SSR) is a Ukrainian public activist, leader of the Ukrainian diaspora in Poland, human rights defender, activist of the year according to the Wprost magazine, producer of the "Ukraїner" and "Chernobyl VR Project" projects.

== Biography ==
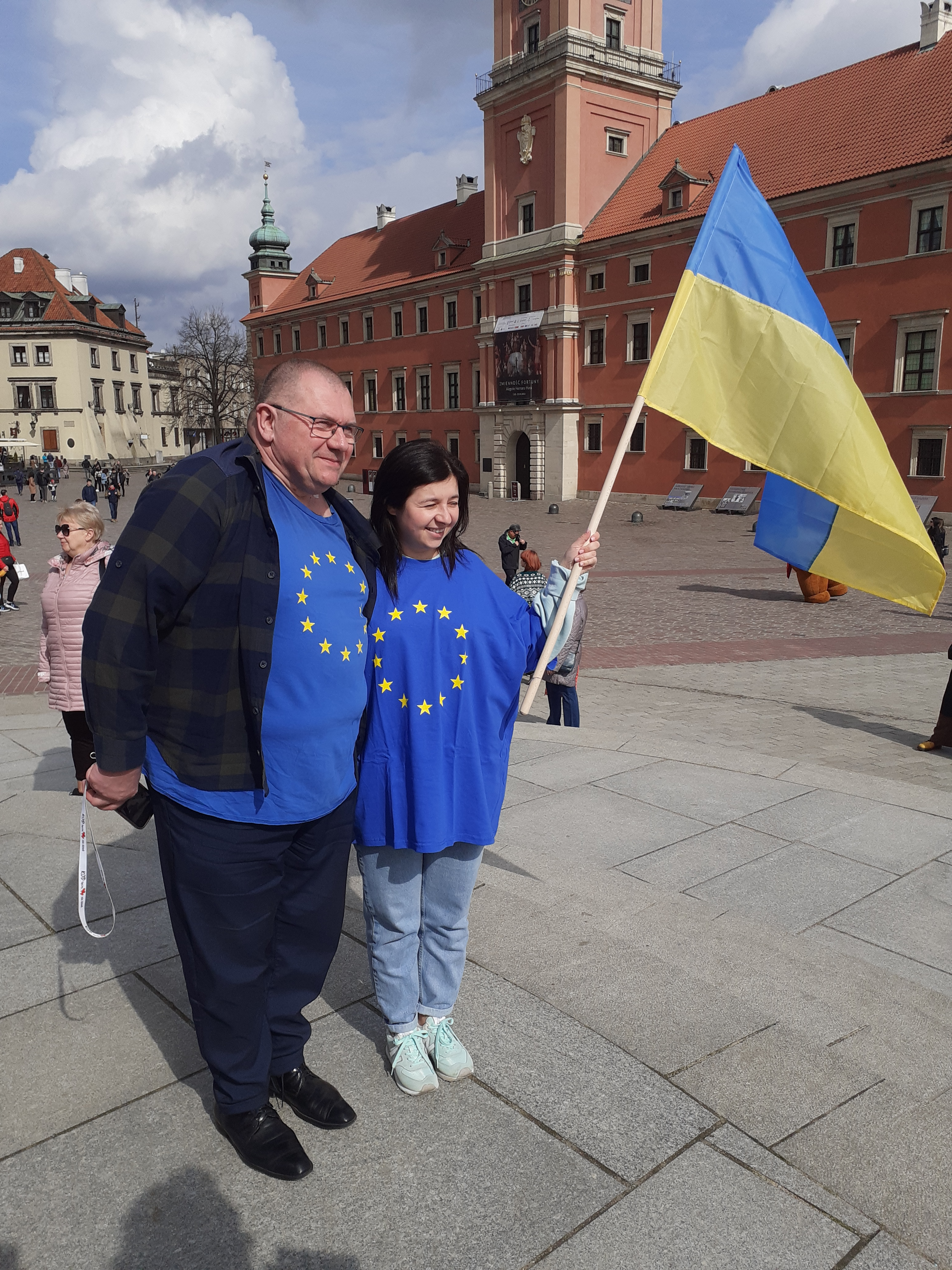
Natalia Panchenko and Jacek Grzegorz Wiśniewski - president of KOD Mazowsze. (2023).

Her father is a chief engineer, her mother is a chief accountant. She obtained a master's degree and completed postgraduate studies at the Poltava State Agrarian University, majoring in Organisational Management (2006-2011), after which she obtained a master's degree in Management from the Warsaw University of Natural Sciences. Married, has a daughter.

== Public activity ==
She was one of the organisers of Euromaidan in Warsaw, during which she held daily peaceful protests near the Embassy of Ukraine. Later, the organisation became a public initiative, and Natalka became its leader. She travelled with the activists to the Maidan in Kyiv, collecting money and humanitarian aid for the activists. Since the beginning of the war in 2014, she has started collecting humanitarian aid for the Armed Forces of Ukraine, volunteers and civilians.

Since 2014, she has worked on the release of Kremlin prisoners and Ukrainian captives from Russian captivity. She organised numerous actions, meetings of families of captives and political prisoners with politicians, coordinated worldwide information campaigns for their release. Involved in the release of Nadiya Savchenko, Oleg Sentsov, Sashko Kolchenko, Roman Sushchenko, Gennadiy Afanasyev and others.

After the start of the full-scale Russian invasion of Ukraine on February 24, 2022, Natalka again led the Polish movement of resistance to the war and support for Ukraine and became an organiser of anti-war protests in Warsaw.

In March 2022, Natalka organised a blockade of Russian and Belarusian trucks transporting sanctioned goods from the EU to Russia. Activists accompanied by Panchenko blocked the Belarusian-Polish and Polish-German borders, demanding from the European Union a ban on Russian and Belarusian trucks transporting goods to Russia. On April 8, 2022, in the fifth package of EU sanctions against Russia, the third item fulfilled the demand of Natalka and her team: the European Union banned the import and transit of new cargo by motor vehicles from Russia and Belarus to the territory of the EU.

At one of the demonstrations under the German Bundestag Olaf Scholz was given the shoes of a child killed in Mariupol, along with a letter demanding that the European Union introduce a trade embargo with Russia and Belarus.

Together with her initiative, she organises anti-war actions and information campaigns in Poland and Europe with the aim of recognising Russia as a terrorist state, strengthening EU sanctions against Russia and freeing Ukrainian prisoners.

Coordinates the collection of humanitarian aid for Ukraine, supports the collection of funds by Poles for a Bayraktar for the Armed Forces.

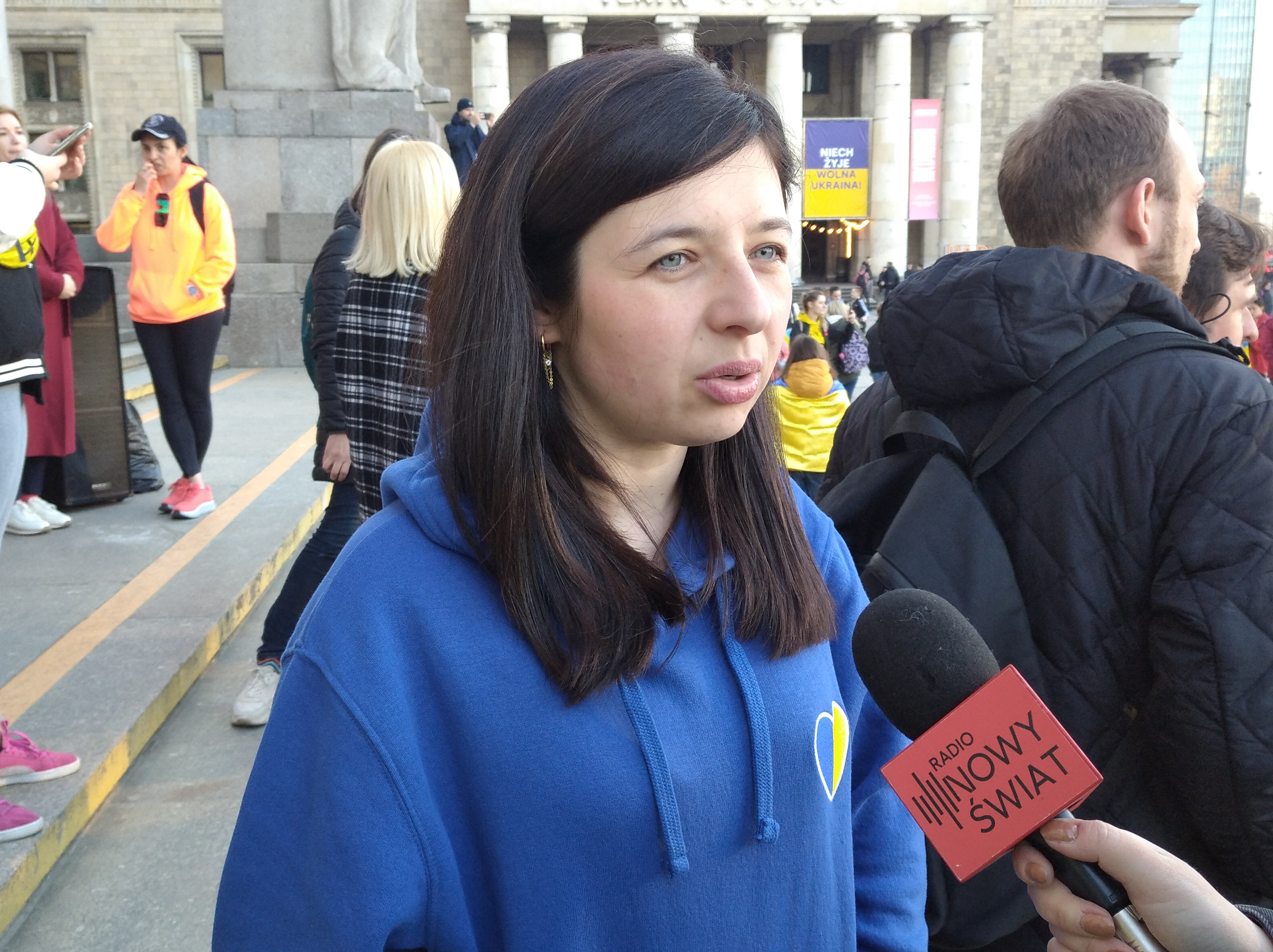
Natalia Panchenko during the interview with Radio Nowy Świat in Warsaw, 2022.

In 2022, she organised a march of thanks to the Poles for their support of Ukraine, in which 20,000 people took part.

== Honours and awards ==
In 2015, the information and analytical agency "Global Ukraine News" recognised the activist as one of the 10 faces of the Ukrainian youth diaspora.

In 2019, she became a laureate of the Volunteer Award of Ukraine.

In 2022, she received the Polish SheO Awards in the "Activist of the Year" category.
