= Natalia Idrisova =

Tajikistani green energy consultant

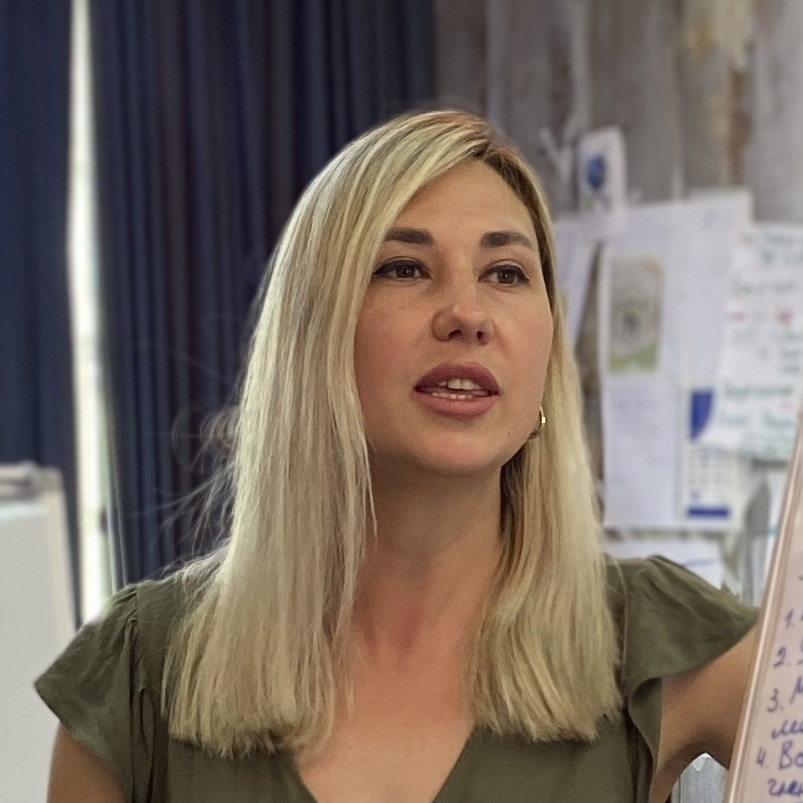
- Born: Dushanbe, Tajikistan
- Known for: one of BBC's 100 women in 2023

Natalia Idrisova is a Tajikistani green energy consultant whose work was recognised in 2024 when she was one of the BBCs 100 most inspiring women.

== Life ==
Idrisova was born in about 1987 in Dushanbe, Tajikistan. Her family were natural conservationists and they brought up their children to think the same. They cared for animals, they did not pick flowers or waste food. In time, her brother started a small non-profit which he named "Little Earth". She became an enthusiastic supporter of her brother's initiative in 2014.

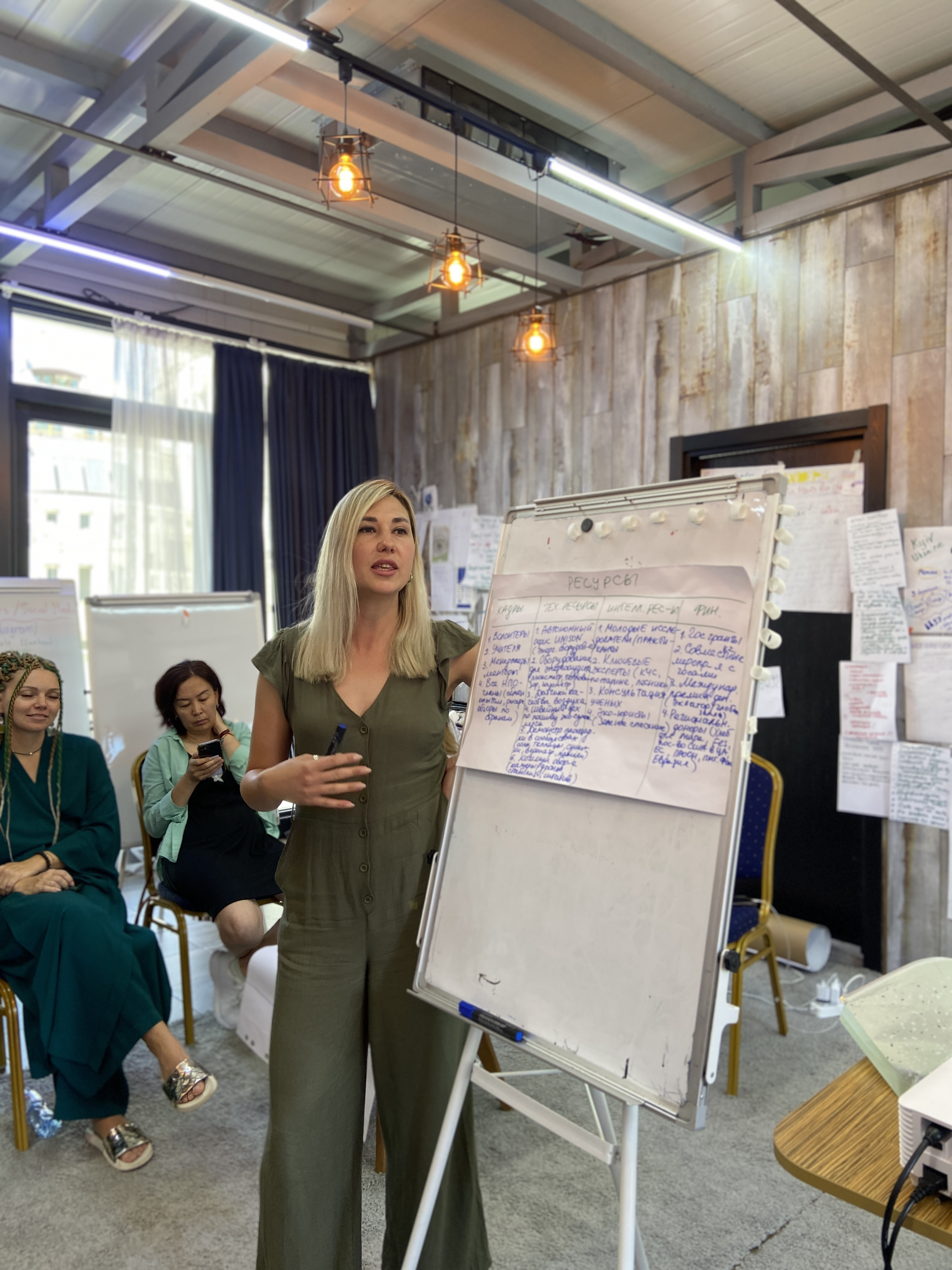
At a CAN EECCA meeting in May 2023

Little Earth works in the mountainous areas of her country where the people have insufficient energy for their own heating. Both firewood and electricity are in short supply. They deliver training and solar powered lights and cookers and energy saving devices like pressure cookers. The local women's time is filled with caring for their livestock and children and gathering firewood. The new ideas and equipment create some free time and ideas, but the decisions are traditionally made in the society by men. She and Little Earth encourage women to feel empowered. She believes that public understanding of environmental issues is low which strengthens the hands of larger companies. She gives the example of trees being cut down. Profit is made, but the locals may have casualties from a landslide that would have prevented by tree roots. People can influence decisions if they are better informed about the underlying issues. Idrisova is on the committee of a pressure group called Climate Action Network – Eastern Europe, Caucacus and Central Asia (CANEECA) – who tackle climate related issues. She sees that a large barrier to change in under developed countries is the balance of power. She says that activists in poor countries do not make climate-related decisions.

She is a critic of her country's energy policy. In per-capita terms her country is the poorest in central Asia. The majority of the power comes from hydro sources but the topping up is achieved by fossil fueled power stations and China was funding the building of more capacity. Tajikistan is committed to improving its contribution to controlling climate. Electric cars are being adopted but Idrisova suspects that they may be running on electricity formed in a fossil fuel based power station.

Idrisova led a masterclass on climate related issues in May 2023. In 2023 she was named as one of the BBC's 100 women of influence.
