= Natalia Alekhina =

Russian chess player (born 1954)

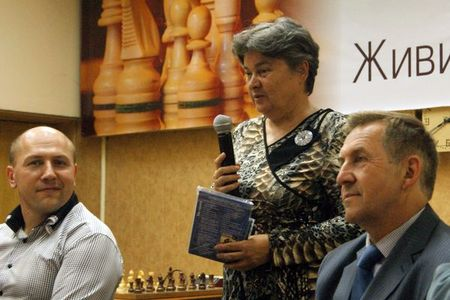
- Alekhina at the 4th World Chess Champion Memorial Tournament in 2014

Personal information
- Born: Natalia Vladimornova Alekhina; 3 February 1954 (age 72) Voronezh, Russian SFSR, Soviet Union
- Spouse: Sergey Arkhipov

Chess career
- Country: Soviet Union → Russia
- Title: Woman Grandmaster (1990)
- Peak rating: 2355 (January 1985)

Natalia Alekhina (Russian: Наталья Алехина; born February 3, 1954) is a Russian chess player who holds the title of Woman Grandmaster.

== Early life and education ==
Alekhina was born in Voronezh, Russian SFSR, on February 3, 1954. She holds a university degree in philology.

== Career ==
Alekhina was trained by Valentin Chistyakov during her early years in Voronezh. She earned her Woman International Master title in 1983, followed by the Woman Grandmaster title in 1990.

Her peak rating was 2355 in January 1985. At the peak of her career she was #4 on FIDE Top 100 women rankings.

=== Individual competitions ===
Alekhina won the USSR Girl's Chess Championship in 1980. She was the winner of the Russian Chess Championship on two occasions, in 1977 and 1982.

Due to her successful performances in several international chess tournaments (Budapest in 1983 and 1984, Balatonberény in 1983, Bologna in 1984), she was invited to the FIDE Interzonal chess tournament in 1985, which would qualify her for the Candidates Tournament if she came in the top six. She failed to qualify, coming in at the 11th-12th place.

She was the winner of the RSFSR Chess Championships held in Kaliningrad in 1977 and in Ordzhonikidze in 1982.

Alekhina participated in the USSR Chess Championship in 1970, 1974 and 1977. She came in last in the 1970 and 1977 championships with 5½ and 3½ points. Her best result was sharing the 8th-10th place in the 1974 iteration.

One of her most noted performances is coming second behind Irina Levitina at the Chess Tournament in Budapest in 1984.

Her latest competitive performance was at the Senior women Championship in 2019, where she took 8th place with 5/5 points in a 40-player tournament.

=== Team competitions ===
Alekhina won the 8th Soviet Team Chess Cup held in Moscow in 1974 as part of VSS Burevestnik.

Alekhina played as a member of the 12-person team Russian SFSR at the 12th Soviet Team Chess Championship in Moscow in 1972. The team came in second out of six competing teams. At the 17th iteration of the same competition held in Volgograd in 1985, she was part of the 8-person team Russian SFSR "B". The team came in 7th out of 17 competing teams.

== Personal life ==
Alekhina is married to Sergey Arkhipov, who is also a professional chess player with a Grandmaster (GM) title. They live in Moscow, Russia.
