= Natalia Nazarova =

Natalya Nazarova or Natalia Nazarova may refer to:

- Natalya Nazarova (born 1979), Russian track and field sprinter
- Natalia Nazarova (politician) (born 1953), Russian politician
- Natalia Nazarova (athlete) (born 1988), Russian volleyball player
- Natalia Nazarova (scenarist) (1969—2025), Russian actress, scenarist, and director
- Natalia Nazarova (actress) (1949—2022), Soviet actor
