= Natalia Kucirkova =

Researcher ORCID ID = 0000–0002-2805-1745

- Born: October 25, 1985 (age 40)

Academic background
- Education: University of Bath; The Open University

Academic work
- Discipline: Education
- Institutions: University College London; The Open University; University of Stavanger

Natalia Kucirkova (born 25 October 1985) is an academic in the field of children's literacies. She is a professor of reading and children's development at The Open University, UK and professor of early childhood and development at the University of Stavanger, Norway.

== Biography ==
Kucirkova received her bachelor's degree from University of Bath and her Ph.D. in education and educational technology from The Open University. Her pre-doctoral fellowship was at Harvard University.

She founded and directs the International Collective of Children's Digital Books and the Children's Digital Book Award, which involve designers, researchers and teachers to support digital literacies for young children. In addition to her research on children's use of e-books and apps, Kucirkova is also an expert on personalization and use of children's personal data. Her research has been supported by funding from national agencies, including the Economic Social and Research Council, the Norwegian Research Council, and the Daiwa Foundation. Kucirkova is co-editor of the journal Literacy and serves on many advisory boards for organizations devoted to children's wellbeing and social justice.

=== Awards and honors ===
- Jacobs Foundation Fellowship
- Emerald Real Impact Award for Developing a Focus on Lifecycle Approaches to Impact
- Olga Camm Award for an inter-disciplinary approach to early literacy research

== Publications ==
=== Books (selection) ===
- 2016. Jumpstart Apps: Creative learning games and activities for ages 7-11, Natalia Kucirkova, Liz Chamberlain and Jon Audain Kucirkova, London: Routledge.
- 2017. Digital Personalization in Early Childhood: Impact on Childhood, Natalia Kucirkova, London: Bloomsbury.
- 2018. How and why to read and create digital books: A guide for primary practitioners. Natalia Kucirkova, London: UCL Press.
- 2020. Children Reading for Pleasure in the Digital Age, Raising the next generation of readers. Natalia Kucirkova and Teresa Cremin London: Sage.
- 2021. The Fragmented and Amplified Self: Understanding personalization in childhood and beyond Natalia Kucirkova, London: Emerald.

=== Articles (selection) ===
- Kucirkova, N. "Children’s reading with digital books: past moving quickly to the future" Child Development Perspectives (2019).
- Kucirkova, N. "Children’s agency by design: Design parameters for personalization in story-making apps" International Journal of Child-Computer Interaction (2019).
- Kucirkova, N. "How could children’s storybooks promote empathy? A conceptual framework based on developmental psychology and literary theory" Frontiers in Psychology (2019).
- Kucirkova, N. "Children’s agency and reading with story-apps: considerations of design, behavioural and social dimensions" Qualitative Research in Psychology (2018).
- Kucirkova, N., Littleton, K., & Cremin, T. (2017) "Young children’s reading for pleasure with digital books: six key facets of engagement" Cambridge Journal of Education, 47(1), 67–84.
- Kucirkova, N. & Littleton, K. (2017) "Developing personalised education for personal mobile technologies with the pluralisation agenda" Oxford Review of Education, 43(3), 276–288.
- Kucirkova, N. (2017) "An integrative framework for studying, designing and conceptualising interactivity in children’s digital books" British Educational Research Journal, 43(6), 1168–1185.
- Kucirkova, N., Dale, P. & Sylva, K. (2016) "Parents reading with their 10-month-old babies: key predictors for high-quality reading styles" Early Child Development and Care, 188(2), 195–207.
- Kucirkova, N. (2016) "Personalisation: a theoretical possibility to reinvigorate children’s interest in storybook reading and facilitate greater book diversity" Contemporary Issues in Early Childhood, 17, 1–16.
