= Natalia Jaster =

American author of fantasy romance

- Education: California State University, Northridge (MA)
- Occupation: Author
- Spouse: Roman Jaster (m. 2001)
- Writing career
- Period: 2014–present
- Genre: Fantasy Romance
- Website: nataliajaster.com

Natalia Jaster is an American author of adult fantasy romance. Her debut novel, Touch, is a re-imagination of the story of Eros featuring the female goddess Love who is forced to pair up a mortal man with whom she has fallen in love. Her second novel, Trick, was published in 2015 and re-released in 2022 after going through some rewrites. It is the story of the court jester Poet and the princess Briar. Trick is now book one in the "Dark Seasons: Foolish Kingdoms" series with the sixth and final installment, Dream, coming out in late 2026.

In 2020, Jaster published Kiss the Fae, the first book of the Vicious Faeries series in the Dark Fables universe. Inspired by the movie Labyrinth, the story is about a girl who must survive a fae's labyrinth in order to save her sisters.

Natalia Jaster received a master's degree in Creative Writing from California State University, Northridge in 2008.

She has also been published in the Northridge Review, Sucker Literary Magazine, YARN, and Mammut Magazine.

== Works ==
=== Dark Seasons: Foolish Kingdoms Series (Series in Progress) ===
- Trick 2nd ed. (2022) ISBN 978-1957824017
- Ruin (2023) ISBN 978-1957824048
- Burn (2023) ISBN 978-1957824079
- Dare (2024) ISBN 978-1957824079
- Lie (2026) ISBN 978-1957824123
- Dream (2nd ed. forthcoming)

=== Selfish Myths Series ===
- Touch (2025) ISBN 978-1957824338
- Torn (2025) ISBN 978-1957824369
- Tempt (2025) ISBN 9781957824390
- Transcend (2025) ISBN 978-1957824420

=== Dark Fables: Vicious Faeries Series ===
- Kiss the Fae (2020) ISBN 979-8699221547
- Hunt the Fae (2021) ISBN 979-8741686485
- Curse the Fae (2022) ISBN 978-1957824222
- Defy the Fae (2022) ISBN 978-1957824246

=== Selfish Myths Series (First Edition, Out of Print) ===
- Touch (2014) ISBN 978-1505444025
- Torn (2019) ISBN 978-1073890910
- Tempt (2019) ISBN 978-1695808218
- Transcend (2020) ISBN 979-8627687148

=== Foolish Kingdoms Series (First Edition, Out of Print) ===
- Trick (2015) ISBN 978-1517494957
- Dare (2017) ISBN 978-1548073213
- Lie (2018) ISBN 978-1727391282
- Dream (2019) ISBN 978-1796231090
