= Natalia da Rocha =

South African actress and director

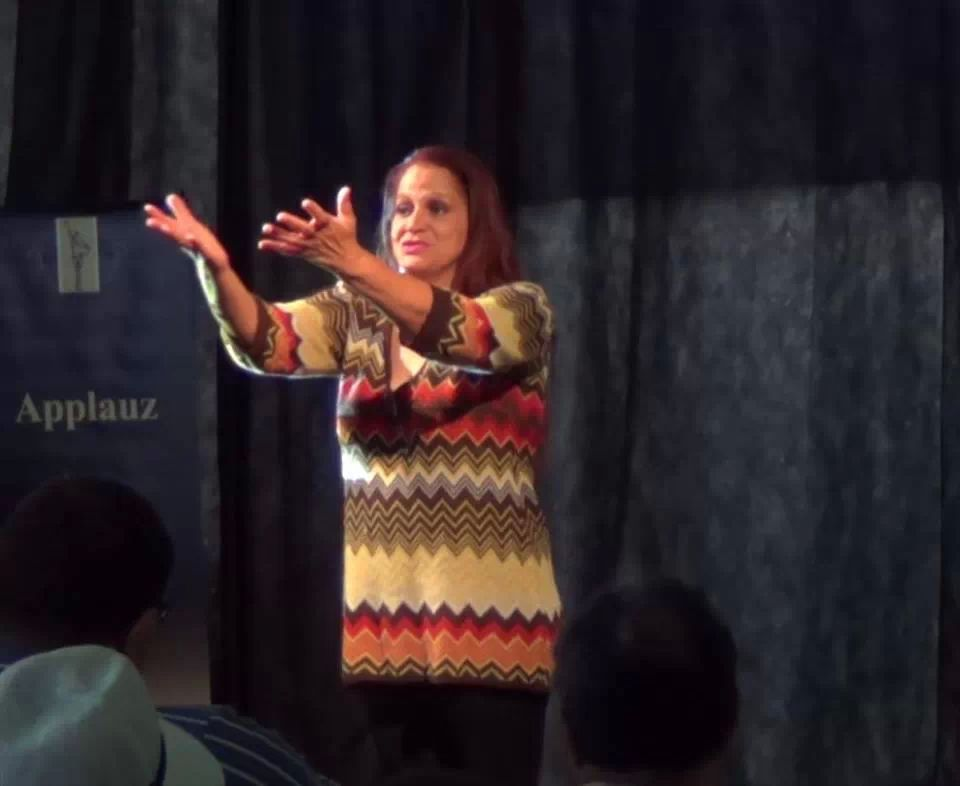
- Rocha in 2014
- Education: Stellenbosch University
- Occupations: actress, director, youth activist and businesswoman
- Spouse: Natalia da Rocha
- Children: 3

Natalia Da Rocha is a South African actress, director, youth activist and businesswoman. She is one of the few persons of colour to appear in entertainment media during the Apartheid era. In 1981 she was the first Coloured (mixed-race person) to graduate with a drama degree from the Afrikaans-dominant Stellenbosch University. Beginning 1987 she was the first woman of colour to star in a Sun City Extravaganza. In 1992 she became the first South African star to perform publicly in Madagascar. She has had roles in musicals such as Ain't Misbehavin', Midnight Blues, and Godspell. Da Rocha was one of 40 people inducted into the S.A. Legends Museum on 26 January 2020 in Johannesburg.

== Early life ==
Da Rocha comes from a large Capetonian family with a mother of Jewish stock and a father of Portuguese descent. Her family was very musical.

== Professional career ==
Da Rocha is a veteran of South African cabaret and stage. She has worked with entertainers such as Des and Dawn Lindberg by playing Mary Magdalen in their 1985 production of Godspell. Her career began in a cabaret duo along with longtime creative partner Sam Marais in Johannesburg's venue No 58, located in the Hillbrow suburb. No 58 had a reputation for allowing different ethnicities to mix freely socially, despite it being illegal in Apartheid South Africa. Her first large-scale production had her learning juggling-skills for two months before rehearsals and then was given the opportunity to be the "catcher" of the trapeze artists in Brickhill and Burke's musical Barnum (1983/84). She's performed on stages such as Cape Town's Baxter Theatre, the Wild Coast Sun resort's mainstage, and Sun City during the Extravaganza. She is also known for her staged impersonations of international divas such as Tina Turner and Shirley Bassey.

She was a regular on the tour circuit at shows such as the Afrikaans-dominant Klein Karoo Nasionale Kunstefees (Afrikaans: Little-Karoo National Arts Festival, KKNK) and Cedarberg Arts Festival. She has numerous nominations as Best Actress in South Africa's Vita Awards (early 1990s) and numerous musical performances during the Artes Awards (mid-1980s).

On the small screen, she has acted in TV serials such as the Afrikaans Gallery, This Life and The Game (about South Africa's institutionalised obsession with rugby union, the youth melodrama Backstage, and as the recurring character Amy on eGoli (Zulu for "place of gold"), South Africa's longest running soap opera. On British television she appeared in the serial Tarzan. Natalia has also co-hosted the Saturday morning women's magazine television programme Just For You and her own retro-hits radio show Classic Hits of our Time on Kaya FM.

Her songwriting credits include co-writing the African Child theme for the International Crystal Awards for Women in Film (1997). During the 1980s, she performed with legendary South African musician Neville Nash on a TV special commemorating his achievements. Da Rocha returned to the musical stage after a five-year break when Deon Opperman offered her a role in his Musical "Vere".

== Community involvement ==
Rainbow Worx is a company she started in the mid-1990s to advance stagecraft among Coloured and Black children in Johannesburg. In 1998, she was the chairperson for Gauteng Province (South Africa)'s Midrand Arts and Culture Town Council. Since 2002 Natalia has been developing APPLAUZ! as an initiative to expose and develop talent among disadvantaged youth in the Western Cape as far as Okiep. Applauz Arts Initiative was registered as a Section 21 Company (not for gain). Several new projects have been developed by Applauz Arts Initiative: SongStar a talent competition with three months of performance training, Wa Was Djy! The Musical, is a tribute to the 60's and 70's Coloured recording artists that recorded against all odds. The Invaders, Flames, Joy, Jonathan Butler, Richard John Smith, Zayn Adam and Pacific Express and Danny Williams. Slavin is a Musical Review of the South African Slave History. The cast recorded a CD for the launch of the production at the Suidooster Fees. In 2012, Natalia recorded These Hands from the Slavin album with a group of young performers from Elsiesriver. It was their first time in a recording studio. The song can be viewed on YouTube. This is my Story is a four-month multidisciplinary training project. Teaching the young candidates to tell their story in video, dance and drama. Natalia and Adam Small collaborated on Adam Small BeJazzed a musical tribute to Adam Small using his poetry with music scored by Camillo Lombard, Kurt Egelhof, Dylan April and Natalia Da Rocha. The young music students from Camillo's CMI academy was given the opportunity to be part of this project. The production opened at the Arena Theatre Artscape January 2015 with Adam Small present. Then Adam Small BeJazzed performed at Cape Town Fringe Festival with a new band under the musical direction of 20 year old Dillon April with Applauz Graduates : David Piet, Noehaa Fortune and Gaynor De Cerff. On 23 November 2018, Adam Small BeJazzed opened the Adam Small Theatre Complex in collaboration with the University of Stellenbosch's third year Drama graduates. In 2019, Natalia directed and produced the Retina S.A. Ripped Genes Concert Fundraiser for Retina S.A. The concert was held at Artcape Theatre and the cast was a mixture of sighted, partially sighted and blind performers. The youngest being two blind bassists from Athlone School of The Blind. She was asked again to direct and produce the 2019 concert.

== Personal life ==
Natalia is married to stage and film veteran, movie producer and former television presenter Kurt Egelhof. She has three children.

== Filmography ==
In 1984, Natalia Da Rocha played her first part in a movie Broer Matie (Afrikaans : Brother Matey) directed by Jans Rautenbach. This movie was then the most high-profile production featuring actors of Colour during Apartheid South Africa and dealt with this period's racial tension. Natalia was also given the opportunity to sing the theme song Bly By My of the movie. Bly By My was composed by Christa Steyn. Vetkoek Paleis. Dekonstruksie van Retta Blom 2023

== Discography ==
Natalia sang the theme song of the 1984 Jans Rautenbach movie Broer Marie; the song is entitled Bly by My, and was written by Christa Steyn. "Die Slavin" (Afrikaans: The Female Slave) was an interactive theatre piece commissioned for the "Suidoosterfees" (Afrikaans : South-Easter Festival) in 2006 . During rehearsals, the cast and band composed and recorded a full-length album released as "slavin". Track listing for the bilingual Afrikaans/English concept album is as follows :

- Here Comes The Ship
- Whitey Laaightie (Afrikaans: "White Boy")
- As Die Wind So Waai (Afrikaans : "When The Wind Blows Like This")
- Die Stam Moeder (Afrikaans: "The Clan Mother")
- Love Torn (Afrikaans: liefde "verskeur")
- Dood Van Die Jaar (Afrikaans: "Death Of The Year")
- Biesmiela (Arabic: "Thank God")
- Thirty Rand Plus Food
- Unknown Coon
- These Hands (Afrikaans: "die Hande")
- Wie's Jou Ma (Afrikaans: "Who's Your Mother")

The multimedia project was a collaboration with Natalia Da Rocha and lyricist Kurt Egelhof and musical arrangement by Celeste Williams.

== See also ==
- Coloured
- Apartheid
- Cabaret
- South Africa
