= Natalia Alieva =

Russian linguist

Natalia Fyodorovna Alieva
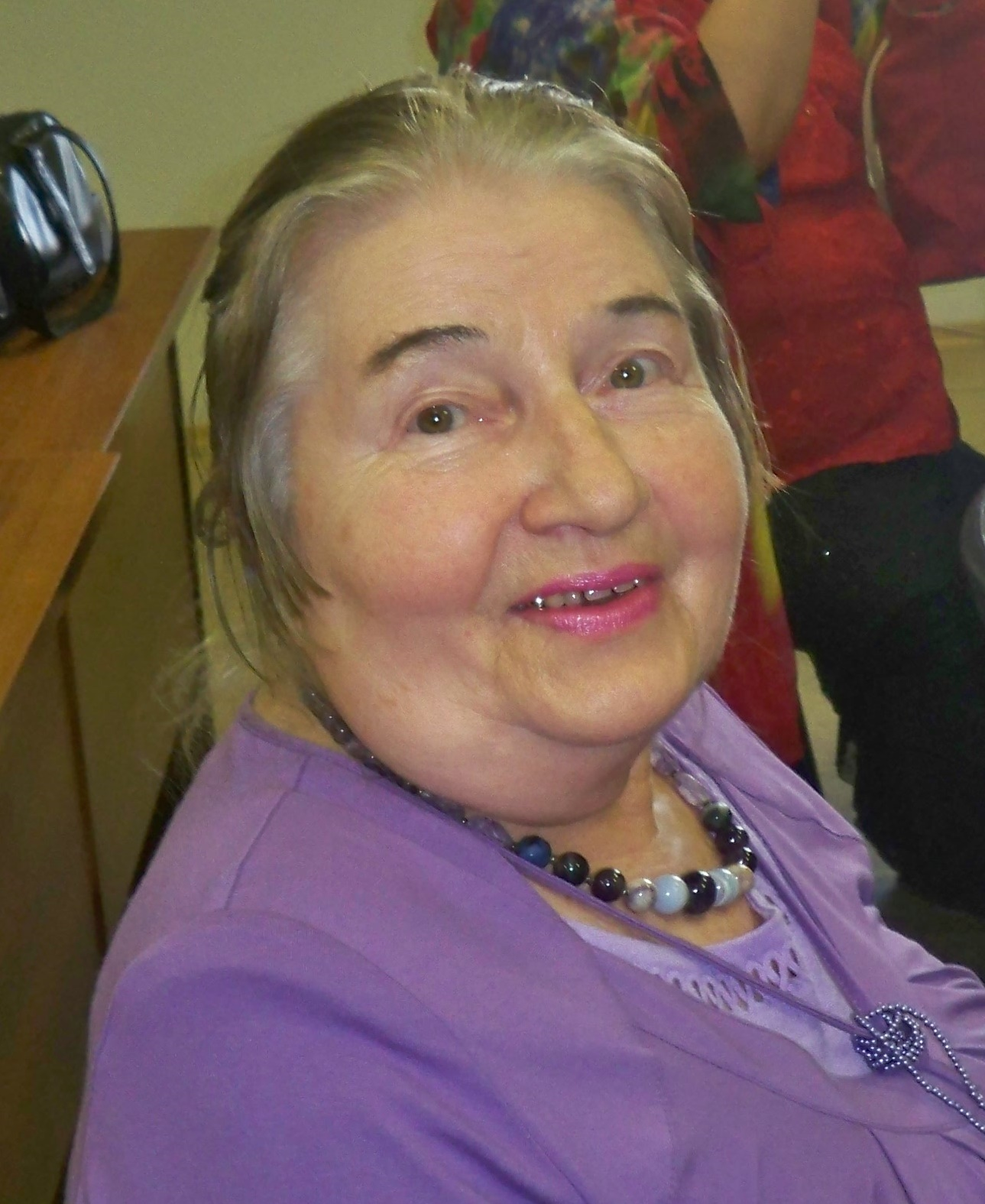
- Natalia Alieva in 2011
- Born: 27 June 1931; Moscow
- Died: 10 February 2015 (aged 83); Moscow
- Education: Moscow Institute of Oriental Studies
- Known for: work in Austronesian languages
- Awards: Medal of Friendship (Vietnam); Medal "In Commemoration of the 850th Anniversary of Moscow"
- Scientific career
- Fields: linguistics
- Workplaces: Institute of Oriental Studies of the Russian Academy of Sciences

Natalia Fyodorovna Alieva (June 27, 1931 in Moscow – February 10, 2015 in Moscow) - Soviet and Russian orientalist, the noted specialist in Austronesian languages and, in particular, in the Indonesian language, Principal Researcher at Institute of Oriental Studies of the Russian Academy of Sciences.

== Brief biography ==
In 1954 she graduated from the Moscow Institute of Oriental Studies with qualification "expert on Indonesia with knowledge of Indonesian and English". She worked at the Institute of Oriental Studies of the Russian Academy of Sciences since 1959. Among her teachers was the pioneer of the study of the Indonesian language in the USSR – Lyudmila Mervart. In 1963, she defended her PhD thesis "Indonesian Verb. Suffixes of Transition", in 1992 - doctoral thesis "Features of the Grammatical Structure of the Indonesian language in typological illumination".

Aliyeva is the largest specialist in the field of Austronesian languages, the author of eight monographs and hundreds of articles in Russian, Indonesian, Malay, French, English and Vietnamese languages, the subjects of which are Indonesian and Malay languages, Cham, grammatical typology. She also specializes in Сham language She is one of the authors of the world's first scientific grammar of the Indonesian language (1972), which was later reprinted in Indonesia in Indonesian. Alieva's research is highly valued both in Russia and abroad.

A lot of Aliyev's life was devoted to scientific and pedagogical activity. For many years she was a member of the Dissertation Council of the Institute of Oriental Studies of the Russian Academy of Sciences in philology (linguistics), regularly worked as the chairman of the examination commission of the Eastern University on Indonesian, acted as an opponent for candidate and doctoral dissertations, reviewed monographs.

A great place in Alieva's work was occupied by scientific and organizational activities and international cooperation. She is one of the initiators of the creation of the Malay-Indonesian Readings and the Nusantara Society, in which she was a member of the Board, in 1991-1996 she was a Corresponding Member of the Bureau of the European Association for South-East Asian Studies. She has repeatedly participated in linguistic congresses and conferences in Indonesia, Malaysia, China, Romania, the Netherlands, the US, Germany, Sweden. In 2002, under the grant of the Council for Language and Literature of Malaysia, she conducted research on the grammar of the Malay language in Kuala Lumpur.

== Criticism. Evaluation of creativity ==
"This book is not only the first scientific grammar of the Indonesian language compiled by Russian linguists, but also the largest and most complete of modern Indonesian language grammars written in any language - N.G. Phillips on the "Grammar of the Indonesian Language".

== Publications ==
- Indonesian language. Series: Languages of the Far East and Africa]. M .: Oriental Literature Publishing House, 1960 (in cooperation with Teselkin A.S.)
- (Ed.) Languages of China and Southeast Asia: Problems of Syntax. Moscow: Nauka, 1971 (in cooperation with Yu. Ya. Plam)
- Grammar of the Indonesian language'. M.: Nauka, 1972 (in cooperation with V. Arakin, A. Ogloblin and J. Sirk)
- Indonesian Verb. Category of Transitivity. M .: Nauka, 1975.
- (Ed.) Languages of Southeast Asia: the problems of reduplications. M .: Nauka, 1980.
- Fundamentals of the theoretical grammar of the Indonesian language. Part 2. Syntax. Lecture course. M .: Voen. Institute, 1980 (in cooperation with A. S. Teselkin).
- Languages (Language situation). - Indonesia. Reference Book. M., Nauka, 1983, p. 281-293.
- Morphemes in Contemporary Spoken Cham: Qualitative and Quantitative Alternations. - Cahiers de Linguistique Asie Orientale, Volume 20, Issue 2, pages 219 – 229 Publication Year : 1991.
- Bahasa Indonesia Deskripsi dan Teori '. Seri ILDEP. Jogyakarta: Kanisius, 1991 (in cooperation with V. Arakin, A. Ogloblin and J. Sirk)
- Asas Ilmu Bahasa di Rusia dan Penelitian Nahu Bahasa Melayu Indonesia. - Kebudayaan Nusantara. Kepelbagaian dalam Kesatuan (Culture of Nusantara)
- Reduplication in Southeast Asian languages: Differences in word structures. - Productivity and Creativity '. Berlin-New York: Mouton De Gruyter, 1998, p. 413-429.
- Typological aspects of Indonesian grammar. Analytism and Synthesis. Possessivity . M.: New Millennium, 1998. ISBN 5-86947-025-0
- The language of cham. Oral dialects of the eastern dialect. Series: Orientalia. St. Petersburg: Petersburg Oriental Studies, 1999 ISBN 5-85803-082-3 (with Bui Khan Thehe).
- (Ed.) Malay-Indonesian Studies. Issue XVI. Moscow: Nusantara Society, 2004.
- (Ed.) Malay-Indonesian Studies. Issue XVIII. M .: Nusantara Society, 2008.
- Structural and typological study of the languages of South-East Asia. Moscow: Institute of Oriental Studies, 2015.

== Awards ==
- Medal of Friendship (Vietnam)
- Medal "In Commemoration of the 850th Anniversary of Moscow"
