= Natalia Todorovschi =

Romanian volleyball player (1931–2007)

Personal information
- Nationality: Romanian
- Born: 19 October 1931; Bucharest, Romania
- Died: 2007 (aged 75–76)

Sport
- Sport: Volleyball

Natalia Todorovschi (19 October 1931 – 2007) was a Romanian volleyball player. She competed in the women's tournament at the 1964 Summer Olympics.
