= Natalia Aszkenazy =

Polish diplomat and writer

- Born: 5 June 1915; Moscow
- Died: 1988 (aged 72–73); New York City
- Resting place: Cuernavaca, Mexico
- Other names: Natacha Eschkenazi; Natalia Drohojowska
- Education: University of Geneva
- Occupations: diplomat, lecturer, magazine writer, philanthropist
- Spouses: Jan Drohojowski (m. 1943–1961) Marcel Franco (m. 1964)
- Children: 2

Natalia Aszkenazy (5 June 1915, in Moscow – 1988, in New York City), also seen as Natacha Eschkenazi and later Natalia Drohojowska, was a Polish diplomat and lecturer during World War II, and a magazine writer in the 1950s. Having traveled to the United States just prior to Poland's invasion in 1939, she was unable to return home. Beginning her career as a Red Cross volunteer, Aszkenazy was appointed as the first woman diplomat of Poland and sent to organize the Polish embassy in the USSR in 1941. Wartime events had left the 1.5 million Poles livinging in Russia in poor condition. When Russia severed diplomatic ties with Poland, she returned to the United States and lectured there until the end of the war. After the war ended, she took right of asylum from Mexico and became a writer and philanthropist.

== Early life ==
Natalia Aszkenazy was born in Moscow, in 1915 the daughter of a Warsaw-based banker. She began at French school in Warsaw, and then studied at the Lycee Victor Duruy in Paris. Continuing her education, between 1929 and 1930, she attended the Lycee Francais de Londres in London, before obtaining her baccalauréat from the Lycee francais de Varsovie in Warsaw in 1933. Further studies were taken in the department of economics and social science of the University of Geneva between 1934 and 1936. Though her educational focus was on economics and politics, Aszkenazy spoke and wrote in English, French, German and Polish.

== Career ==
In 1939, Aszkenazy left Poland traveling through France on her way to the United States to attend the 1939 New York World's Fair. The outbreak of World War II in Poland forced her to remain abroad and she joined the American Red Cross in New York City. After a brief stint working for the Red Cross, Aszkenazy was appointed as a press and public relations officer at the Polish embassy in Washington, D.C., from 1939 to 1941. She was attached to the Polish embassy in Moscow from 1941 to 1943, when Poland recalled its diplomatic staff over the Katyn massacre. Her work in Russia revolved around establishing an embassy to care for the 1.5 million Poles living in Russia in the war-time conditions, in which rationing was imposed and they were viewed suspiciously because of their nationality. Aszkenazy was also involved in the evacuation of Polish Jews from the USSR to Iraq. She was described in 1941 as "the only woman in the diplomatic corps in Moscow" and in 1943 as the "only Polish woman diplomat". During World War II she gave lectures in the United States about her experiences as a woman diplomat and about the post-war hopes of the Polish people. Her "sultry" looks and stylish wardrobe were often as much commented upon as the content of her speeches. She also addressed an anniversary celebration for the Polish constitution in 1944, in Los Angeles.

In 1945, her husband was appointed ambassador to Mexico. As a diplomat's wife, Aszkenazy corresponded with Chilean poet Gabriela Mistral and Pablo Neruda dedicated Canto General número 32 (1949) to her. She was also a benefactor of the small town San Sebastián Chimalpa in Mexico, donating books and a well in 1950. In 1950–1951, she wrote cultural criticism of Mexican cinema in a pair of articles for Films in Review. In 1951, she published Traveling in Mexico (Spanish: Viajeras en México), which chronicled her travels from one end of Mexico to the other. Critical review of the book indicated that she understood the colonial history and tragedy of the country's development, as well as the language and people. Later Aszkenazy was a staff writer at Anita Brenner's English-language magazine Mexico/This Month. In 1951, she moved with her husband to Egypt where he became an ambassador. Next year, he was accused of plotting against the king of Egypt and forced to leave the country as persona non grata. As he returned to Poland, Natalia and their son moved to Mexico via Paris.

== Personal life ==
Natalia Aszkenazy married a Polish count, fellow diplomat Jan Drohojowski (1901–1979), in 1943. Her husband worked for the Polish government-in-exile in London. He was later posted to Mexico, Nicaragua, and Egypt, before becoming a writer. Their son Francisco (Pancho) Drohojowski was born in Mexico in 1947. In 1957 she was granted political asylum in Mexico with her young son, while her husband was briefly imprisoned in Poland and unable to emigrate because of Polish communist government's restriction on international travel. In 1961, Natalia got divorced. Three years later, she married Marcel Franco, American citizen living in Mexico.

Natalia was buried in Cuernavaca under a tree called by her son the "Good Shadow".
