= Natalia Romero =

Natalia Romero may refer to:

- Natalia Romero (Chilean athlete) (born 1980), Chilean long-distance runner
- Natalia Romero (Spanish athlete) (born 1988), Spanish runner
- Natalia Romero (badminton) (born 1997), Colombian badminton player
