= Natália do Júnior Garimpeiro =

Brazilian politician (born 2004)

Member of the Legislative Assembly of Maranhão
- Incumbent
- Assumed office 1 February 2027

Personal details
- Born: Natália Silva Melo; 18 October 2004 (age 22)
- Party: Brazil Union

Natália Silva Melo (born 18 October 2004), better known as Natália do Júnior Garimpeiro, is a Brazilian politician who was elected member of the Legislative Assembly of Maranhão in 2026. She was the youngest person elected to a state legislative assembly of Brazil in the 2026 general election. She is in a relationship with the mayor of Centro Novo do Maranhão.
