= Natalia Parés Vives =

Spanish chess player and teacher (born 1955)

Personal information
- Born: August 31, 1955 (age 71)

Chess career
- Country: Spain
- Title: FIDE Master (1985)
- Peak rating: 2380 (July 1994)

Natalia Parés Vives (born 1955) is a Spanish chess player and teacher who holds the chess title of FIDE Master (FM).

She is recognized for being a pioneering openly trans woman in competitive chess.

== Competition wins ==
- Spanish under-20 chess championships runner-up in 1973 and 1975.
- Runner-up in 1975 and 1987 of Catalonia Chess Championship.
- Runner-up in 2008 Catalonia Women's Championship.

Parés Vives represented Spain in the Chess Olympiad in 2008 in Dresden, and in the European Individual Chess Championship in 2009.

== External ==
- Natalia Pares Vives rating card at FIDE
- Natalia Pares Vives chess games at 365Chess.com
