= Natalia Rodríguez =

Natalia Rodríguez may refer to:

- Natalia Cruz (Natalia Rodriguez Carrillo, born 1976), Colombian journalist in the United States
- Natalia Rodríguez (runner) (born 1979), Spanish middle-distance runner
- Natalia (Spanish singer) (Natalia Rodríguez Gallego, born 1982), Spanish singer
- Natalia Rodríguez (actress) (born 1992), Spanish actress
