= Natalya Medvedeva =

Natalya Medvedeva may refer to:

- Natalya Medvedeva (actress) (1915– 2007), a Russian film and stage actress
- Natalia Medvedeva (tennis) (born 1971), a Soviet, CIS and Ukrainian tennis player
- Nataliya Medvedeva (singer) (1958–2003), Russian singer, poet and writer
