= Natalia Lengauer =

Ukrainian doctor

Natalia Andriivna Lengauer (20 August 1908 - 1997) was a Ukrainian ambulance doctor, Honored Doctor of the USSR (since 1950), Heroine of Socialist Labor.

== Early life and education ==
Natalia Lengauer was born on 20 August 1908 in the village of Kefalivka (now the town of Dolynska, Kirovohrad region) in a family of hereditary intellectuals. Her father, Andrii Ksaverovych Lengauer, a railway engineer, came from a family of German colonists who moved to the southern lands of the Russian Empire at the invitation of Empress Catherine II. Mother, Olga Markivna Chestakhivska, granddaughter of the artist Hryhoriy Mykolayovych Chestakhivsky, a close friend of Taras Shevchenko, the initiator of the reburial of Kobzar on Chernecha Hora.

== Career ==
Lengauer began working at the Kyiv Central Ambulance Station as a doctor in 1946, and from 1948 she headed it, working in this position until 1975. These were the years of rapid development of the station.

Natalia Lengauer achieved the introduction of specialized ambulance crews - psychiatric, neurological, toxicological, anti-shock, hematological, pediatric intensive care. Thanks to her perseverance, since the 1950s, ambulance substations were actively created on the Left Bank of Kyiv, in remote areas, and on the outskirts of the capital.

Since 1961, the development of the ambulance service began. For the first time in the USSR, Lengauer organized a specialized thromboembolic brigade (1961), which went on acute heart attacks. The number of such brigades was constantly increasing, in 1985 there were already 14. This was a real cardiac emergency vanguard, strengthened by the work of an around-the-clock laboratory of emergency diagnostics.

It was at the Kyiv ambulance station that for the first time in the USSR introduced the transmission of an ECG by telephone from the place of call to clarify the diagnosis. For the first time in the recent history of an ambulance, the anti-infarction team introduced an electrode connected to a pacemaker into the heart cavity during a call at the patient's apartment. The chief physician of the station, Lengauer, stood next to Dr. V. Kaminsky, who performed this unique operation. At that time, there were no specialized departments with acute myocardial infarction in hospitals, so the main blow in rescuing such patients was taken by ambulance. It was a real clinic on wheels, which significantly reduced the death rate in the city from heart attacks.

In the 1960s, the Kyiv Medical Care Station quickly became a real school of excellence for both domestic and foreign specialists.

In 1965, the station was approved by the School of Best Practices of the USSR; 1965: the station becomes the base for WHO annual seminars; 1966: the station is already a school of best practices of the USSR; 1967: the 4th International Congress on Ambulance is held on the basis of the Kyiv Ambulance. The station is visited twice by the Secretary-General of the WHO. This was the period of the highest rise of the authority of the Kyiv Ambulance, to which she owes Lengauer.

For high merits in the organization of medical care, in particular, the creation of a unique cardiac service, Natalia Lengauer was awarded the Golden Star of the Hero of Socialist Labor.

Natalia Lengauer died in 1997. She was buried in Kyiv, in the Lukyaniv Cemetery (section No. 20).

== Awards and honors ==
- Hero of Socialist Labor (1969).
- Honored Doctor of the Ukrainian SSR (1950).
- Diploma of the Presidium of the Verkhovna Rada of the USSR.
