= Natalia Cabrerizo =

Spanish swimmer

Personal information
- National team: Spain
- Born: 24 July 1980 (age 45)

Sport
- Sport: Swimming

Natalia Cabrerizo (born 24 July 1980) is a Spanish former freestyle swimmer who competed in the 2000 Summer Olympics.
