= Hallie Ford Museum of Art =

Museum on the Willamette University campus in Salem, Oregon, U.S.

Coordinates: 44.938512°N 123.033733°W

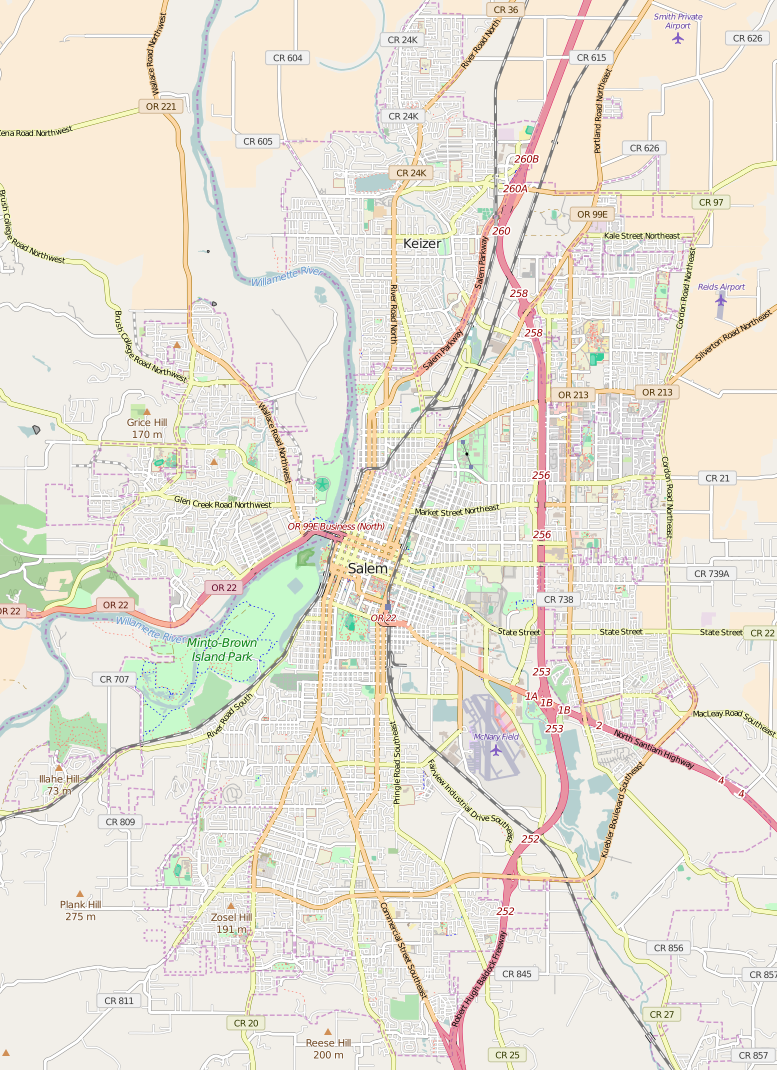
- Location in Salem, Oregon Hallie Ford Museum of Art (Oregon)
- Established: 1998
- Location: Salem, Oregon, United States
- Type: private: art
- Visitors: 30,000 (2003)
- Director: John Olbrantz
- Website: willamette.edu/arts/hfma

The Hallie Ford Museum of Art (HFMA) is the museum of Willamette University in Salem, Oregon, United States. It is the third largest art museum in Oregon. Opened in 1998, the facility is across the street from the Oregon State Capital in downtown Salem, on the western edge of the school campus. Hallie Ford exhibits collections of both art and historical artifacts with a focus on Oregon related pieces of art and artists in the 27,000 square feet (2,500 m^{2}) facility. The museum also hosts various traveling exhibits in two of its six galleries.

== History ==
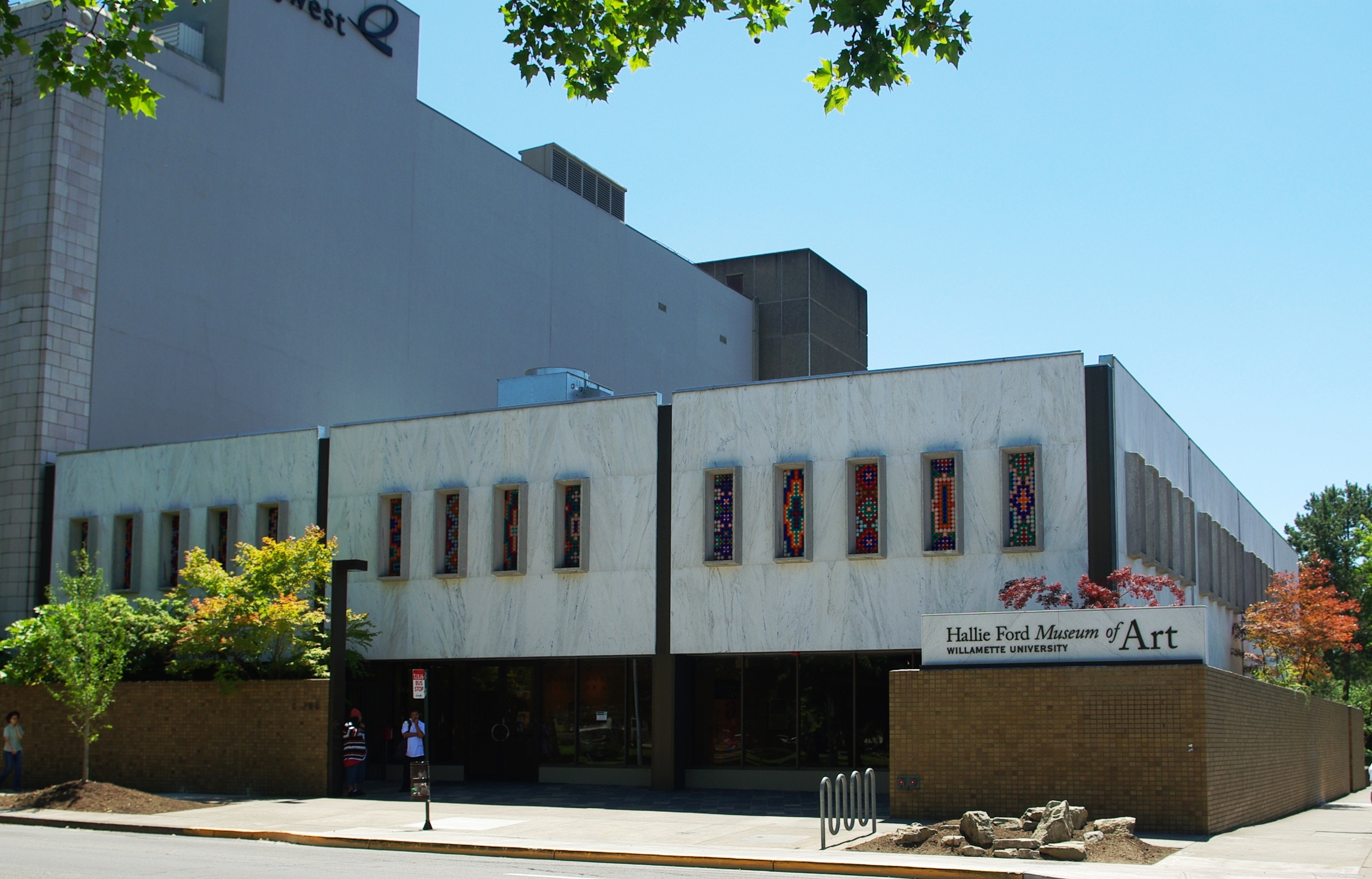
North side of the museum with main entrance

Prior to the creation of the Hallie Ford Museum, Willamette University previously collected various pieces of art donated to the university. By 1896 the collections were housed in a museum located on the fourth floor of Waller Hall. By 1940 the museum had moved to the second floor of the gymnasium (now the Theatre Playhouse). At that time the museum's collection included birds, various documents, minerals, wood specimens, shells, plant specimens, and Native American artifacts, among others.

In 1990, the school received a donation of around 250 pieces of ancient, European, Middle Eastern, and Asian art from the Sponenburgh family. Alumnus Dan Schneider suggested to an art faculty member, Roger Hull, that the school should have a museum to display the university's art collection in 1992. Then in 1994 Roger Hull made a presentation to the school's trustees to push for the creation of an art museum. Over the next two years plans were developed and donations were made that led to the purchase of a building near campus for a museum. One large donation came from Hallie Ford and the Ford Family Foundation that allowed the purchase and remodel to move forward. The museum officially opened in 1998 with over 3,000 pieces of art, and was the second largest art museum in the state at that time.

The museum was named top fine arts venue and art gallery in the local region in 2002 by residents. In 2003, the facility received a Certificate of Award from the Oregon Art Education Association, and was named as the third best art gallery in Oregon's mid-Willamette Valley region. Attendance at the museum was approximately 16,000 in the first full-year of operation and increased to around 30,000 people per year in 2003.

In July 2007, the museum began a remodeling project to add storage to the basement areas and the room used for studying prints. The $850,000 remodel was completed in December 2007 with funding coming from a donation by Maribeth Collins. Also in 2007, Hallie Ford Museum of Art was given an American Masterpieces grant by the National Endowment for the Arts through the Oregon Arts Commission. This $50,000 grant helped to fund an exhibit entitled "The Art of Ceremony" regarding tribal ceremonies of Native American tribes in Oregon. The museum introduced the "Breath of Heaven, Breath of Earth" exhibit in 2013, which was billed as its most ambitious exhibit.

The museum is part of the Monuments Men and Women Museum Network, launched in 2021 by the Monuments Men Foundation for the Preservation of Art.

== Building ==
The building housing the museum was built in 1965 for Pacific Northwest Bell. This International Style building contains 27,000 square feet (2,500 m^{2}) on three floors (two above ground), and was designed by local architect James L. Payne. In 1996, the building then owned by US West Communications was purchased by the university. Willamette then remodeled the building during 1997 to 1998 with the design coming from Jon Wiener of Soderstrom Architects of Portland, Oregon.

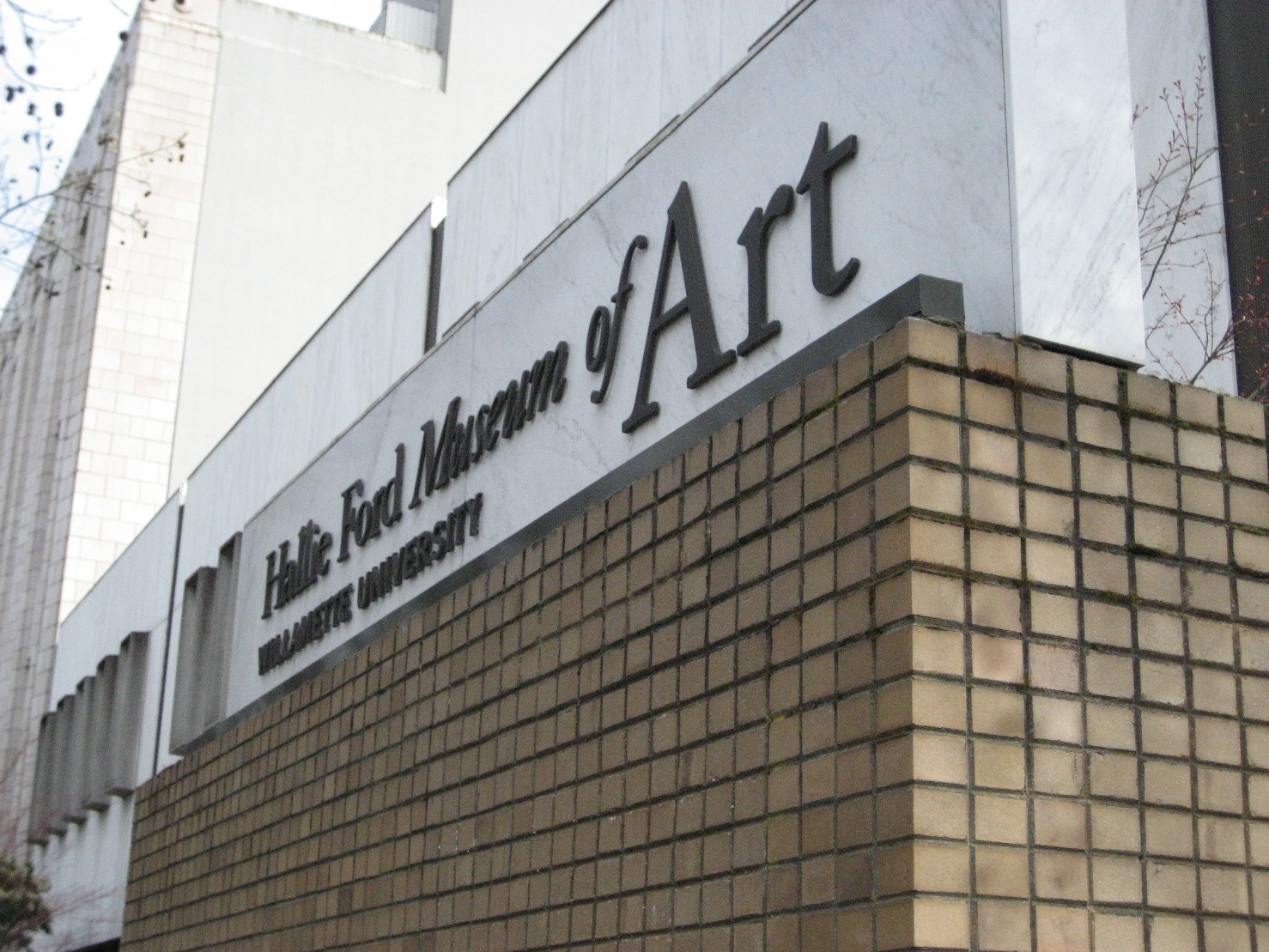
Entrance to the museum

The building opened on October 3, 1998, with a two-story atrium gallery, curves located throughout the interior space, marble panels, and an enclosed garden on the exterior. Additionally, the brick faced structure has an exterior patio constructed of slate. There are a total of six galleries at the museum, with four used for permanent collections and two galleries used for traveling exhibits. In 2008, colored reflector panels were added to the narrow second floor windows in order to provide more color to the exterior. Measuring 69.5 inches high by 21.75 inches wide, some of the panels are illuminated from the interior.

== Collections ==
Hallie Ford Museum of Art has a diverse collection of art from across cultures and eras. Six exhibition galleries contain artwork from different mediums such as sculptures, paintings, basketry, and prints. Artwork includes Native American art, European paintings, American art, and contemporary art. The museum also features local art and artists.

Confederated Tribes of the Grand Ronde Gallery contains basketry made by Native American tribes in the Pacific Northwest. These pieces are from the Byrd and Polleski Collections acquired during the 1940s. The museum also contains the Carl Hall Gallery that holds a variety of work, including work by former faculty members. Other galleries at the museum include the Melvin Henderson-Rubio Gallery that exhibits traveling collections, General Collections Gallery that displays Asian and European artwork, the Study Gallery that shows small temporary collections, and the Print Study Room that exhibits prints and photographs.

HFMA holds two paintings by German landscape painter Frederick Ferdinand Schafer (1839–1927). Morning in the Adirondacks and Olympic Mountains, Washington were both acquired in 1996 by the museum. Other pieces of art include Egyptian art, Korean art, African art, Indian art, and etchings by Dutch artist Antonie Waterloo. The museum also houses the Paulus Collection of photograph glass negatives of the Salem area from the early Twentieth Century.

Hallie Ford Museum of Art is a member of both the American Association for State and Local History, and the American Alliance of Museums. The museum has an endowment of $4.5 million as of 2005.

=== Past exhibits ===
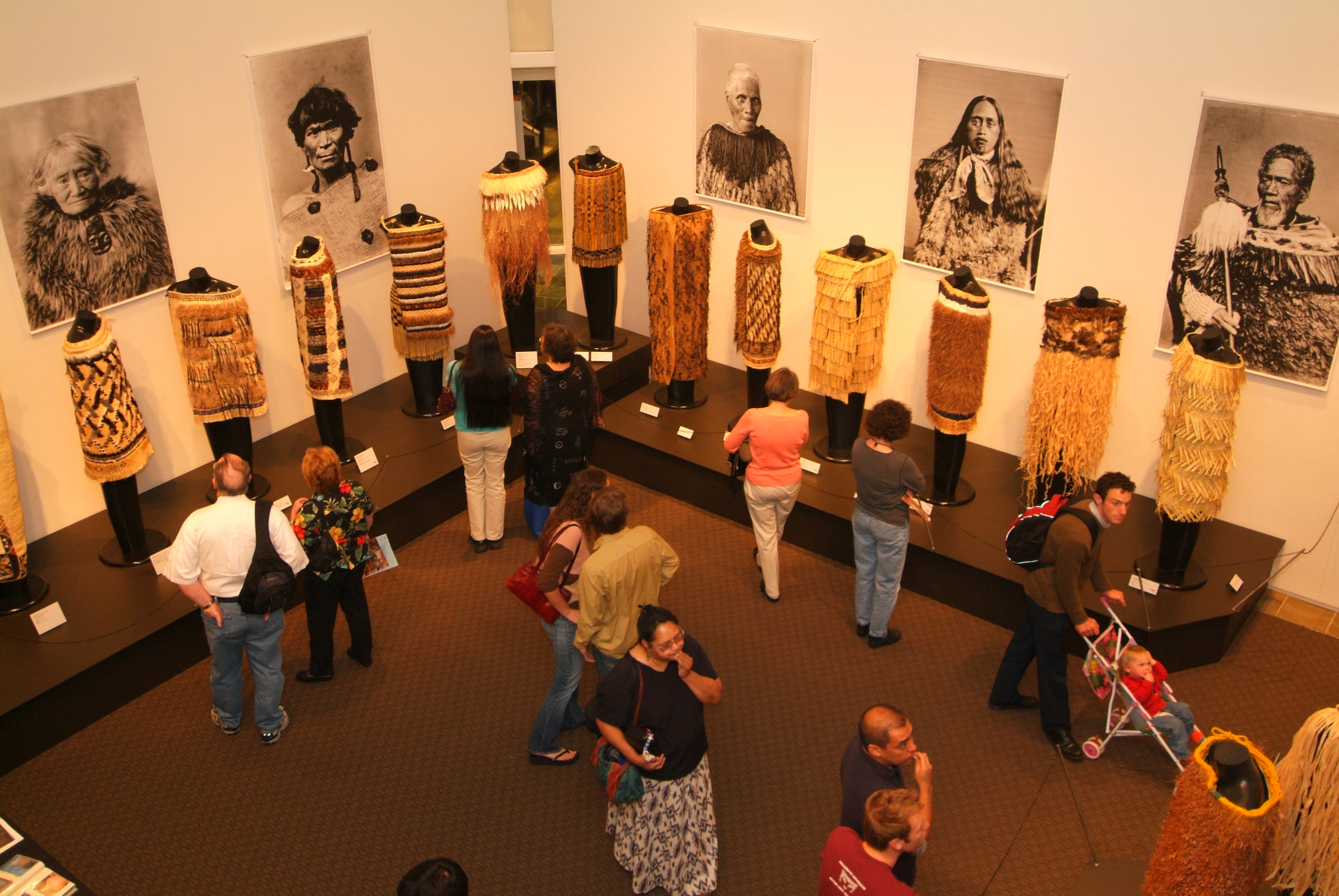
Toi Maori: The Eternal Thread

Seattle painter Michael Spafford's works were featured in a 1999 show HFMA. In 2005, the museum displayed a retrospective of Portland artist Michael Brophy. The museum held a show in 2007 featuring work by Oregon painter Amanda Snyder. Other exhibits have included shows on Rick Bartow, Jacob Lawrence, David Giese, Fay Jones, Eunice Parsons, David Gilhooly, Mary Lou Zeek, and Robert Hess among other artists. HFMA has also hosted traveling exhibits on Egyptian art in 2002, was one of three U.S. stops for the "Toi Maori: The Eternal Thread" exhibit, exhibited a collection of ancient glass work in 2007, and displayed an exhibit on ancient Roman and Greek artifacts. In 2011, AMERICANA by Ross Palmer Beecher was exhibited in the Melvin Henderson-Rubio Gallery.

== Namesake ==
Hallie Ford was one of the founders of the Ford Family Foundation. She graduated from East Central University in Oklahoma and moved to Oregon after graduation. Ford became a trustee at Willamette University in 1975. She was the wife of Kenneth W. Ford and they built Roseburg Forest Products Company in Roseburg, Oregon, beginning in 1936. From this they later started a foundation that would grow to become the Ford Family Foundation in 1996. Ford died on June 4, 2007, at age 102.
