= Yvonne Twining Humber =

American artist (1907-2004)

- Born: December 5, 1907; New York City
- Died: May 13, 2004 (aged 96); Redmond, Washington
- Education: National Academy of Design; Arts Student League
- Style: American Regionalism
- Spouse: Irving Humber

Yvonne Twining Humber (December 5, 1907 – May 13, 2004) was an American artist. She was born in New York City in 1907, and was influenced by Impressionist and Regionalist painters through her education at the National Academy of Design and the Art Students League, then went on to paint cityscapes of Boston and New York through the Works Progress Administration in the 1930s. After marrying a businessman from Washington, Humber relocated to Seattle, where she became known for her hard-edge depictions of the Northwest natural landscape, and as a member of the Women Painters of Washington. During her lifetime, her work was exhibited in major national museums and galleries, and is included in the collections of the Seattle Art Museum, the National Gallery of Art, the Smithsonian American Art Museum, the Bellevue Arts Museum, and the RISD Museum.

== Early life ==
Yvonne Twining was born in New York City on December 5, 1907 to Harry E. Twining, an amateur watercolorist and textile manufacturer, and Emma Estelle Potts Twining. Her mother performed in the Paris Opera under the pseudonym Madame d'Egremont. After her birth, the Twining family lived in Montreal briefly before moving to England. After her father died from pneumonia while serving in France during World War I, Humber and her mother relocated to Iowa, then Montreal, before settling in South Egremont, Massachusetts, her mother's hometown, in 1923.

== Education ==
Humber attended a Catholic girls' school while living in Iowa. After moving to South Egremont, she befriended Impressionist painters Charles and Katherine Almond Hulbert, and received her first painting instruction from them.

In 1925, Humber moved to New York City to study at the National Academy of Design, and beginning in 1928, took concurrent classes at the Art Students League, where she began to develop a Regionalist painting style. Her teachers at the National Academy of Design included Charles C. Curran, Raymond Neilson, and Sidney Dickinson. While in New York, she stayed at the Three Arts Club, a residence on the Upper West Side for single female artists. From 1930 to 1932, Humber also studied under Charles Webster Hawthorne at his informal school in Provincetown. She later took lithography classes at the School of the Museum of Fine Arts, Boston, in 1942.

== Art career ==
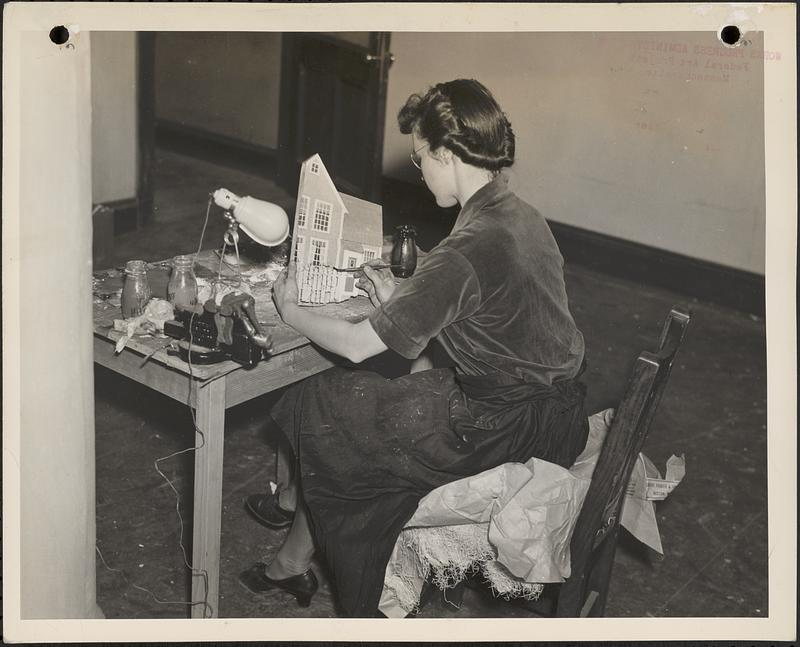
Yvonne Twining Humber working on a diorama for the Works Progress Administration around 1935.

As a student in New York, Humber exhibited works at Jean Roosevelt's GRD Studio, the Three Arts Club, and Macy's department store. In 1933 and 1934, Humber received fellowships from the Tiffany Foundation to paint in Oyster Bay, New York, where she was influenced by artists such as Luigi Lucioni, Edna Reindel, and Paul Cadmus. When the Public Works of Arts Project began in 1933 in response to the Great Depression, she moved to Boston to work in her home state, then returned to New York after the program's dissolution in 1934. In 1935, she returned to Boston again to work as an easel painter for the Works Progress Administration's Federal Art Project. Because Humber supported herself and her mother, she could not afford to rent a studio, and often painted in situ, using public transportation to move around the city with her easel and paints. Humber's paintings of cityscapes and rural life earned her a national reputation and favorable criticism; her Riverside Drive earned an award at an exhibition in Stockbridge, Massachusetts. In the 1930s and 1940s, her work was shown at the Boston Project galleries, the M.H. de Young Memorial Museum, the Boston Museum of Modern Art, and the New York World's Fair.

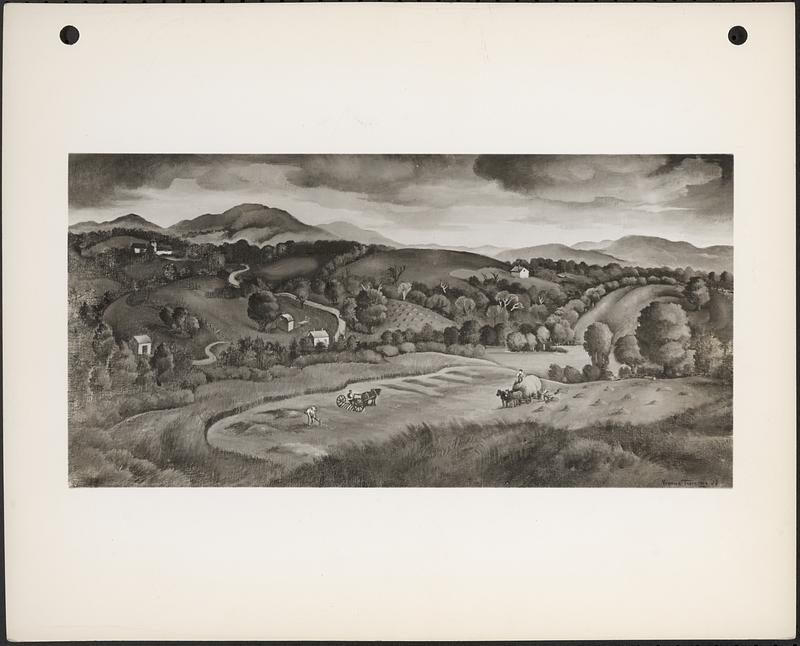
A landscape drawing of Massachusetts created by Yvonne Twining Humber for the Federal Art Project.

In 1936, Ruth Reeves of the Index of American Design commissioned Humber to paint Shakers in Hancock, Massachusetts.

After the Federal Art Project ended in 1943, Humber found herself without work and unable to find gallery representation in Boston or New York, and briefly worked as a steel cutter for a General Electric plant. In 1944, she moved to Seattle, where she joined the Women Painters of Washington, and later served as the president of the group. Humber also became a part of the Northwest Printmakers Society. From 1945 to 1952, she taught at the Broadway Edison school to support her family, which included her mother and mother-in-law.

Humber's work shifted after moving to the Northwest, and she heavily favored depicting natural landscapes over the city scenes she had previously been known for. She earned a local reputation for standing out from the Northwest School of artists, which included Mark Tobey, Morris Graves, and Guy Anderson. In 1946, she had a solo exhibition at the Seattle Art Museum, and won a prize for her painting Green River, which was shown with the National League of American Pen Women at the Smithsonian Institution. She also exhibited at the Northwest Annual, the California Palace of the Legion of Honor, the San Francisco Museum of Art, and the Denver Art Museum.

In the late 1950s, Humber's art career was hampered by personal tragedies, such as the deaths of her infant daughter, her mother, and her mother-in-law. She and her husband traveled extensively in the 1950s, until he died from cancer while in Greece in 1960. She took over his wholesale business until 1964, when she regained financial stability by selling the company and was able to continue painting and drawing. Though she continued to work with oils and hard-edge styles, she began to abandon Regionalism and experimented with printmaking, Sumi painting, and serigraphs in the 1970s.

In 1976 and 1977, her work from the WPA reappeared in several exhibitions on the East Coast celebrating the United States Bicentennial.

In 2001, Humber helped establish the Twining-Humber Award for Lifetime Achievement, through a donation to Artist Trust. The award provides $10,000 to Washington-based female artists over the age of 60, and has been awarded to artists included Fay Jones, Barbara Noah, and Marita Dingus.

== Personal life ==
While living in the Berkshires, she was introduced to Irving Humber, a Viennese pianist and wholesaler, and married him after two weeks, on December 5, 1943.

Humber died on May 13, 2004 at the age of 96 in Redmond, Washington.
