= Artist Trust =

Non-profit organisation in the USA

Coordinates: 47.618623°N 122.317052°W

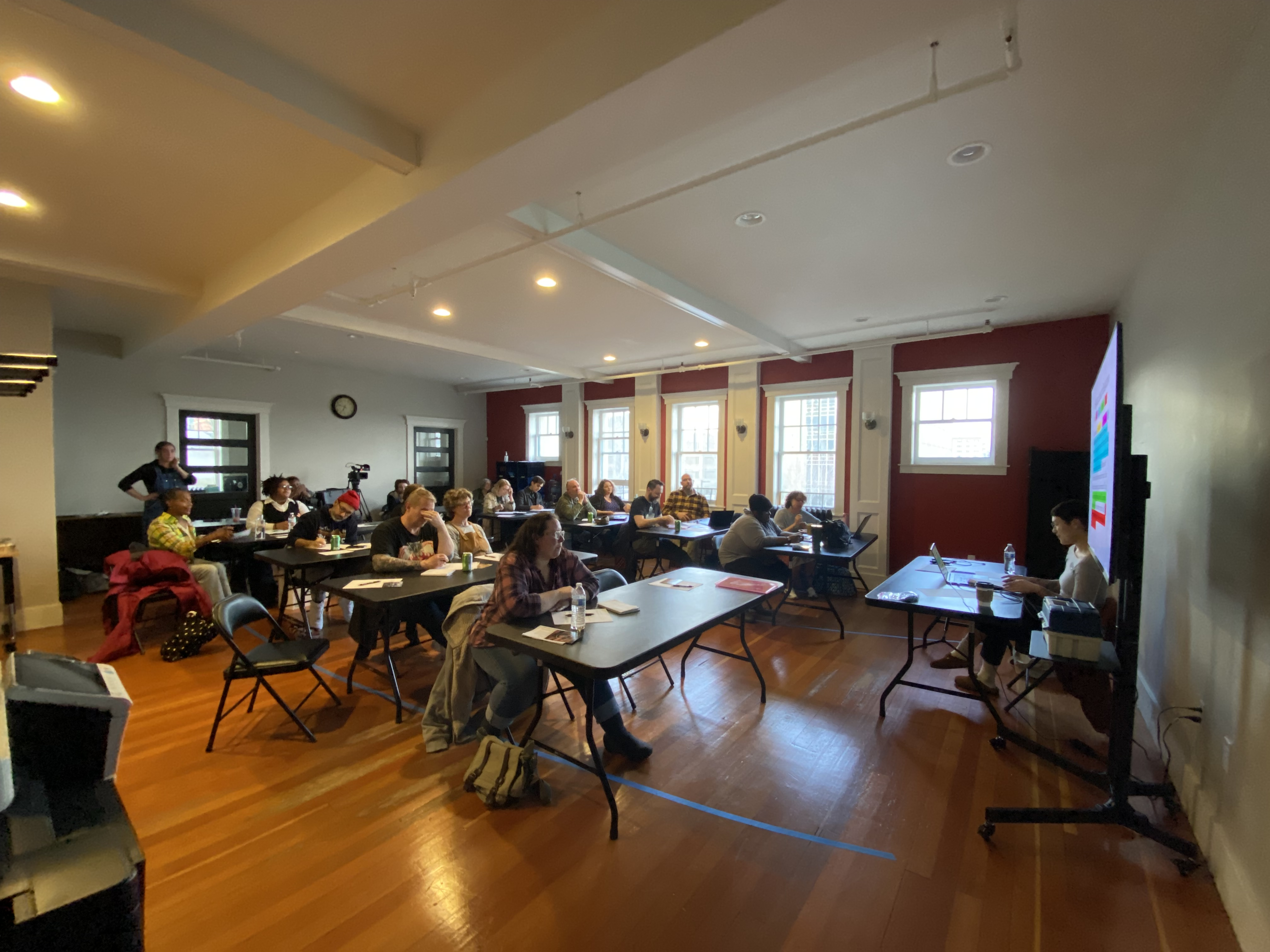
An Artist Trust workshop in Tacoma, Washington

Artist Trust is a not-for-profit organization dedicated to supporting Washington artists working in all creative disciplines. Artist Trust provides artists the time and resources necessary to prosper. Since 1987, it has invested over ten million dollars in grants, resources and career training to thousands of Washington State's most promising and respected musicians, visual artists, writers, dancers, craft artists, filmmakers, cross-disciplinary artists and more. It is located in Seattle, Washington, and serves the entire state.

== Background and programs ==
Artist Trust was founded in 1987 by a group of artists and artist supporters who sought a creative way to remedy the lack of support for individual artists of all disciplines in Washington State. It is the only organization in Washington State, and one of few throughout the country, that provides grants directly to individual artists. Artist Trust serves thousands of artists annually through its core programs of Grants and Information Services.

Artist Trust's Creative Career Center provides career training and professional development necessary for artists, including information on funding, health care, opportunities, legal issues, housing and studio space, and more. It offers workshops on grant-writing and resources for artists throughout the year, as well as the comprehensive EDGE Professional Development Program. The GAP program provides funding for art projects, career training and workshops. Artist Trust also presents the annual Twining Humber Award, an award of $10,000 for female visual artists over the age of 60. The award is funded by a donation from painter Yvonne Twining Humber, and has been award to Washington-based artists such as Fay Jones, Barbara Noah, Debora Moore, Ross Palmer Beecher, and Marita Dingus.

In October 2016, painter Ari Glass was featured at the 30th birthday of Artist Trust.

== Funding ==
Artist Trust is supported by the Gene & Liz Brandzel Fellowship & EDGE Scholarship, Sowing the Seeds, and the Dale and Leslie Chihuly Foundation.
