= Fay Jones =

Fay Jones may refer to:

- E. Fay Jones (1921–2004), American architect and designer, an apprentice of Frank Lloyd Wright
- Fay Jones (artist) (born 1936), American artist
- Fay Jones (politician) (born 1985), British Conservative politician
