= Rob Young Walker =

American producer and filmmaker

Rob Young Walker (born Robert Walker) is a producer, filmmaker, and musician from Tacoma, Washington. He has also worked under the name Rob Young.

Walker produced the documentary Bring Them Home, which examines the experiences of U.S. military veterans who were deported after their service.

He later co-created the stage production Said By The Father and Son with his father, Leon Walker.

== Early life and music ==
Walker grew up in Tacoma, Washington, and attended Stadium High School. He became interested in poetry and hip-hop while growing up and later worked in music under the name RobYoung.

His music work included collaborations with Romanian artist Drei Ros. In 2020, Walker was involved in the development of Excuse My Accent, a music and social-impact project focused on immigrant experiences and discrimination.

== Bring Them Home ==
While working on Excuse My Accent, Walker became interested in the experiences of U.S. military veterans who had been deported after serving in the armed forces. He later connected with deported veteran Hector Barajas, whose work became part of the development of the documentary Bring Them Home.

Walker served as a producer of Bring Them Home, which documents the experiences of deported U.S. military veterans and efforts advocating for their return to the United States.

In 2024, Bring Them Home was selected for a Courageous Documentary Filmmaking Grant from the Seattle International Film Festival, which identified Walker as the film's producer. In 2025, the film received the Local Choice award at the GI Film Festival San Diego.

== Said By The Father and Son ==
In 2025, Walker and his father, Leon Walker, created Said By The Father and Son, a stage production combining music, poetry, and storytelling centered on fatherhood, family, legacy, and their relationship as father and son.

== Recognition ==
In 2026, Walker received an Artist Trust Fellowship in Performing Arts.
