= Polaroid 20×24 camera =

Very large instant camera

Polaroid 20×24
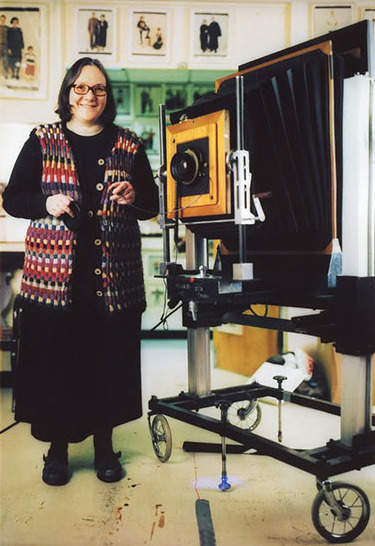
- Self portrait of Elsa Dorfman with her Polaroid 20x24, taken with another 20x24

Overview
- Maker: Polaroid
- Type: Instant large format field camera
- Production: 1976–78

Sensor/medium
- Sensor type: Film
- Sensor size: nominally 20 in × 24 in (51 cm × 61 cm)
- Film format: Instant (peel-apart roll)

Focusing
- Focus: Manual, via bellows extension

Exposure/metering
- Exposure: Manual
- Exposure metering: External meter required

Flash
- Flash: External

Shutter
- Shutter: Between-lens

Viewfinder
- Viewfinder: Ground glass/hood
- Frame coverage: 100%

General
- Dimensions: 25.2 in × 40.9 in × 59.1 in (64.0 cm × 103.9 cm × 150.1 cm) (W×L×H)
- Weight: 240 lb (109 kg)

The Polaroid 20×24 camera is a very large instant camera made by Polaroid Corporation, with film plates that measure a nominal 20 by 24 inches (51 cm × 61 cm), giving the camera its name, although at least one camera takes pictures that are 23 by 36 inches (58 cm × 91 cm).

== Design ==
The Polaroid 20×24 is one of the largest format cameras currently in common use and could be hired from Polaroid agents in various countries.

A plexiglass sheet is taped to the front of the lens, and the subject uses their reflection to help determine where they are in the frame. Because of the size of the image, acquiring an image with sufficient depth of field can be a challenge, and the lens (the camera at 20×24 Studio in New York City was fitted with a Fujinon-A 600 mm f/11 lens) is often stopped down to f/90. Lenses were available in a variety of focal lengths ranging from 135 mm to 1200 mm, but only the 600 mm, 800 mm, and 1200 mm lenses were designed for the 20×24 format.

The 20×24 is collapsible for storage and transport like a field camera: the bellows are compressed into the body, and the body lowers into its base. In use, the bellows can be extended from 17 to 60 in (43 to 152 cm); the front standard has a movement range of 24 in (61 cm) (rise and fall), 6 in (15 cm) (side-to-side shift), and 4 in (10 cm) (swing) while the rear standard is fixed and has no movements. The body of the camera may be moved from 24 to 72 in (61 to 183 cm) above ground level.

The film comes out of the BOTTOM of the camera. I always feel I am delivering a baby or praying to a cameragod because I pull the film out on my knees. The pod end comes out first.

— Elsa Dorfman, from photographer's website

Developing chemicals are stored in foil pods housed in the processing unit at the rear of the camera, and are applied to the exposed film via 22-inch-wide (56 cm) titanium rollers. The film comes on two rolls: a 150-foot-long (46 m) negative roll and a 50-foot-long (15 m) positive roll. After the negative is exposed, one foil pod is ruptured by the rollers and the developing chemicals are spread between the negative and positive rolls as the film exits the bottom of the camera's rear processor; 1 1/2 minutes after exposure, the negative and positive are peeled apart, producing the finished photograph.

=== History ===
According to John Reuter, a former Polaroid employee, only six cameras were built between 1976 and 1978; five remain in use. Photographer and 20x24 specialist Tracy Storer clarified that two prototypes were built first, then using the lessons learned, five finished cameras were completed; famous artists and photographers were invited to use the cameras at the Polaroid studios on the condition that Polaroid was allowed to keep some of the resulting images. The camera was built by the company's wood and metalworking studios under the supervision of John McCann, at the request of Dr. Edwin Land, who wanted to demonstrate the quality of Polacolor II film, which the company was about to launch in 8×10 format. The first portraits were taken at the 1976 Polaroid shareholders' meeting.

The 20×24 Studio was spun off from Polaroid in 1980, with Reuter assuming technical and artistic lead duties, and the studio's camera moved to the Museum of Fine Arts, Boston in 1982. That year, camera time was made available to students. 20×24 Studio moved to New York in 1986 to service the demand for commercial photography there, and the original space became known as 20×24 Studio Boston.

In 1997, Tracy Storer assembled the first new production 20×24 in 20 years using spare parts and a 20×24 field camera front built by Wisner Classic Manufacturing Company; Storer had been hired by Calumet Photographic to build the camera for a new large format studio in San Francisco, which was renamed The Polaroid 20×24 Studio West in 2001, and later Mammoth Camera. Storer has since built additional 20×24s on private commission and for 20×24 Holdings, one of which was shipped to Germany. Wisner also offered a processor for Polaroid film (essentially the rear section of a 20×24), allowing the use of Polaroid 20×24 film with the large Wisner field camera; at least one Wisner processor is owned by 20×24 Holdings to test film.

Polaroid 20×24 Cameras
No.	Owner	Location	Notes
1	MIT	Cambridge MA	Original prototype which is now an empty shell; rollers and motor were removed.
2	20×24 Holdings	New York City	Two cameras: one is studio-based (at the Film Society of Lincoln Center), and the other is the "travel" camera
3	Supersense	Vienna	Originally acquired by The Impossible Project. Currently operated by Supersense, offering photo shoots to the public.
4	Elsa Dorfman	Cambridge MA	Dorfman used the camera from approximately 1980 until her retirement in 2015.
5	20×24 Studio Berlin	Berlin	Originally acquired by Jan Hnizdo and moved to Prague; later purchased by Markus Mahla in 2018 for 20×24 Studio Berlin.
6	Estate of Edwin Land	Cambridge MA	Bequeathed to the Harvard Collection of Historical Scientific Instruments in 2004; it was a retirement present for Land in 1982.
–	20×24 Studio West	San Francisco	"Hybrid" camera assembled by Tracy Storer using parts from one prototype and a Wisner front.

Production of the film for the 20×24 was discontinued in 2008, with approximately 550 boxes in stock at the time. Each case of film contained one negative roll, three positive rolls, and 39 pods, able to make up to 45 exposures with sparing use. When the photographer Elsa Dorfman retired in 2015, only half the remaining stock was left, although The Impossible Project said it was exploring how to restart film production. 20×24 Studio, which was founded by Reuter to lease the cameras and sell the required supplies, announced it had restarted production of the chemicals in 2010. However, 20×24 Studio later said in 2016 that support would be discontinued at the end of 2017; at the time, it cost US$1,750 (equivalent to $2,350 in 2025) per day to rent a camera and each exposure was an additional US$125 (equivalent to $168 in 2025). Improvements to the chemistry made using the old, stored film more viable, and 20×24 Studio later said it would be able to continue operations through 2019.

In 2021, Ethan Moses built a new 20x24 camera, utilizing the RA-4 Reversal Process, which, while nearly instant, is not "Polaroid".

== Users and portrait subjects ==
Photographers including Dawoud Bey, Ellen Carey, Chuck Close, Elsa Dorfman, Timothy Greenfield-Sanders, David Levinthal, Mary Ellen Mark, Robert Rauschenberg, Joyce Tenneson, Andy Warhol, Natalie White, and William Wegman have used this heavy (235 lb or 107 kg), wheeled-chassis camera. Ansel Adams used the camera, notably to make the first official photographic presidential portrait, of President Jimmy Carter in 1979.

To celebrate actress and musician Lady Gaga's new role as creative director of Polaroid, a portrait of her was shot with the 20×24 camera on June 30, 2010, at the Massachusetts Institute of Technology.

The film director and artist Tim Burton has used the 20x24 Polaroid camera and images he has taken featured in the London Design Museum exhibition The World of Tim Burton in 2024-5.
