= Joyce Tenneson =

American fine art photographer (born 1945)

- Born: May 29, 1945 (age 79); Weston, Massachusetts, United States
- Known for: Photography
- Awards: ICP Infinity Awards 1989; WIPI Distinguished Photographer Award 1990
- Website: tenneson.com

Joyce Tenneson (born May 29, 1945) is an American fine art photographer known for her distinctive style of photography, which often involves nude or semi-nude women.

== Biography ==
Tenneson earned her master's degree in photography from George Washington University after starting as a model for Polaroid. She left her job as a photography professor at 39, and moved from Washington D.C. to New York. Tenneson shoots primarily with the Polaroid 20x24 camera. In an interview with a photography magazine, Tenneson advised artists: "I very strongly believe that if you go back to your roots, if you mine that inner territory, you can bring out something that is indelibly you and authentic - like your thumbprint. It's going to have your style because there is no one like you." As a child, her parents worked on the grounds of a convent, which is where she grew up with her two sisters. She and her sister "were enlisted to be in holiday pageants and processions. It was a mysterious environment - something out of Fellini - filled with symbolism, ritual, beauty, and also a disturbing kind of surreal imagery."

Her work has been displayed in more than 100 exhibitions around the world. Tenneson has had cover images on several magazines including Time, Life, Entertainment Weekly, Newsweek, Premiere, Esquire and The New York Times Magazine.

== Awards ==
In 1989, Tenneson received the "Infinity" award from the International Center of Photography, and in 1990 received Women in Photography International's "Photographer of the Year" award.

In 2005, Tenneson received the Lucie Award for "Professional Fine Art Photographer of the Year."

In 2012, Tenneson received the Lifetime Achievement Award from Professional Photographers of America.

In 2018, Tenneson received the Lucie Award for Achievement in Portraiture.

In 2021, Tenneson was inducted into the International Photography Hall of Fame.

== Books ==
- In/Sights: Self-Portraits by Women (1978) ISBN 0879232471 OCLC 4527409
- Joyce Tenneson Photographs (1984) ISBN 0879235020 OCLC 11520573
- Au-delà (1989) ISBN 2859490868 OCLC 25325214
- Joyce Tenneson: Transformations (1993) ISBN 0821219332 OCLC 26012566
- Illuminations (1997) ISBN 0821223844 OCLC 36783749
- Light Warriors (2000) ISBN 0821226983 OCLC 44413955
- Wise Women: A Celebration of Their Insights, Courage, and Beauty (2002) ISBN 0821228188 OCLC 48383461
- Flower Portraits: The Life Cycle of Beauty (2003) ISBN 0821228536 OCLC 52156208
- Intimacy: The Sensual Essence of Flowers (2004) ISBN 0760761507 OCLC 57071083
- Amazing Men: Courage, Insight, Endurance (2004) ISBN 0821228552 OCLC 52948960
- Joyce Tenneson: A Life in Photography, 1968-2008 (2008) ISBN 0316004081 OCLC 1342517042
- Shells: Nature's Exquisite Creations (2011) ISBN 0892729767 OCLC 712118600

== Major exhibitions ==
- Joyce Tenneson - Botanical Beauty, Vanderbilt University Fine Arts Gallery, Nashville, TN (2018)
