= No Hair Day =

- Directed by: Bob Burns
- Produced by: Bob Burns
- Starring: Deborah Dorsey; Libby Levinson; Carol Potoff; Elsa Dorfman
- Cinematography: Bob Burns
- Edited by: Bob Burns
- Production company: Cambridge Studios Inc.
- Distributed by: WGBH
- Release date: 1999
- Running time: 60 minutes
- Country: United States
- Language: English

No Hair Day: Laughing (and Crying) Our Way Through Cancer is a 1999 documentary film about a photo-shoot of three women undergoing treatment for breast cancer, which was broadcast on PBS on October 10, 2001, as part of the Independent Lens series and on WGBX-TV.

== Background ==
Bob Burns of Cambridge Studios in Boston, Massachusetts filmed portrait artist Elsa Dorfman on 12 March 1998 taking large format 20x24 Polaroid photos of his wife, Debbie Dorsey, along with Libby Levinson and Carol Potoff as they posed in "chemo chic". The women had met in a breast cancer support group, and all had lost their hair to chemotherapy at the time. The hour-long documentary was produced by WGBH-TV. The photos and film were exhibited by the DeCordova Museum from September 2000 to January 2001. A decade later, the photos will be on display at the Danforth Museum of Art in Framingham, MA from September 11 - November 6, 2011.

== Book ==
Dorfman released a book of the same name in 2004 featuring the photographs of the shoot. She has said of the shoot that "The pictures are so perfect. The subject was so touching. I don't think I will have another day like that."

== Cast ==
- Deborah Dorsey
- Libby Levinson
- Carol Potoff
- Elsa Dorfman
