= The B-Side: Elsa Dorfman's Portrait Photography =

2016 American documentary film directed by Errol Morris

- Theatrical release poster
- Directed by: Errol Morris
- Produced by: Steven Hathaway
- Starring: Elsa Dorfman
- Cinematography: Nathan Allen Swingle
- Edited by: Steven Hathaway
- Music by: Paul Leonard-Morgan
- Production companies: Fourth Floor Productions; Moxie Pictures
- Distributed by: Neon
- Release dates: September 4, 2016 (Telluride Film Festival); June 30, 2017 (United States)
- Running time: 76 minutes
- Country: United States
- Language: English
- Box office: $125,227

The B-Side: Elsa Dorfman's Portrait Photography is a 2016 American documentary film directed by Errol Morris. The film explores the life and career of Elsa Dorfman. The film was released on June 30, 2017, by Neon.

The film premiered at the Telluride Film Festival on September 4, 2016. The film was released on June 30, 2017, by Neon.

== Synopsis ==
Following her retirement, Elsa Dorfman lovingly showcases her photographic works from her fifty-year career in photography while also telling personal and professional anecdotes and describing her artistic motivations. The film has a loose chronological narrative. Dorfman starts by showing her early black and white photographic work. She recalls moving to New York City to work for Grove Press, where she became acquainted with Beat writers, including Allen Ginsberg. She then describes moving back to Massachusetts to teach elementary school, at which point, the photographer assigned to work with her introduced her to photography. By the 1970s, she had photographed Andrew Wylie, Victor Bockris, Anaïs Nin, W. H. Auden, Andrea Dworkin, Ed Sanders, Gail Mazur, Audre Lorde, and Anne Sexton. Dorfman then describes her excitement over the release of the 20x24 Large Format Polaroid in 1980, which is followed by footage of her using the 20x24 Polaroid she was eventually able to rent, one of only five. She goes on to show the first photo she took on the 20x24, a photo of Allen Ginsberg with an amaryllis. Dorfman goes through other photos she had taken on the 20x24 and recollects the memories associated with them. This includes her parents, husband, son, and Ginsberg, who became a lifelong friend. She reflects on the death of her parents and of Ginsberg, as well as more lighthearted memories of her past birthdays. She talks about Polaroid going out of business and how it affected her, overall conveying her artistic motivations and understanding of her photographic mediums.

== Reception ==
This film was well-received overall, receiving a rating of 97% on Rotten Tomatoes.

Glenn Kenny with the New York Times writes, "Part of Mr. Morris’s reputation as a great documentary filmmaker is derived from his friendly-seeming but pressing interview technique, but here, when he’s heard, he speaks to Ms. Dorfman as a friend, and she responds to him with warm reminiscences of her beginnings as a photographer...Ms. Dorfman emerges as an artist of deep compassion, empathy, humor and wisdom. During a montage of photographs of Ginsberg, he is heard in a late-’50s audio recording reading his great poem 'America.' Lines like 'America when will you end the human war' and 'America why are your libraries full of tears' resonate with a particular poignancy even today, as does 'America when will you be angelic.' 'The B-Side' is a portrait of a genuine American angel."

Robert Abele with the Los Angeles Times writes, "This is the rare Morris movie that feels led by the personality of its star figure, in this case Dorfman’s wry positivity and love of what she does, rather than his need to probe. You can almost sense Morris smiling off-camera as she pulls each exposure from her file drawers for reminiscing and newfound scrutiny — that’s how strong and warm his admiration is for Dorfman and the humble richness of her work."

== Soundtrack ==
The soundtrack for this film was written by Paul Leonard-Morgan and released in 2018. Paul Leonard-Morgan and Errol Morris also worked together on Wormwood (miniseries) and American Dharma.
