= Grolier Poetry Bookshop =

Bookstore in Cambridge, Massachusetts, United States

Coordinates: 42.37232°N 71.11656°W

- Industry: Specialty retail
- Founded: 1927
- Founder: Adrian Gambet and Gordon Cairnie
- Headquarters: Cambridge, Massachusetts, United States
- Number of locations: 1 store
- Area served: Boston metropolitan area
- Products: Poetry books
- Owner: Ifeanyi Menkiti
- Website: http://www.grolierpoetrybookshop.org/

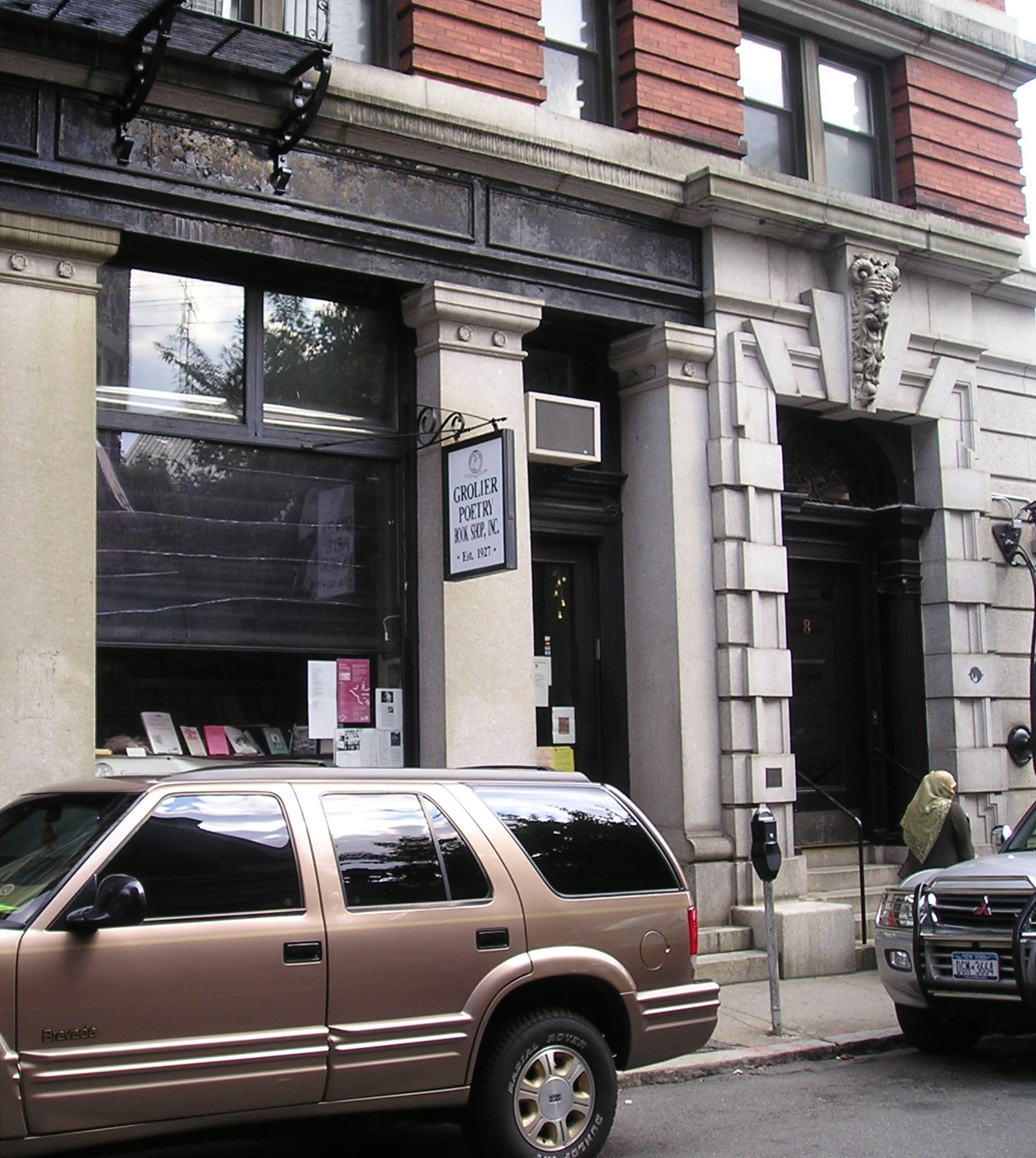
Outside Grolier Poetry Book Shop, August 2005

The Grolier Poetry Book Shop ("the Grolier") is an independent bookstore on Plympton Street near Harvard Square in Cambridge, Massachusetts, United States. Although founded as a "first edition" bookstore, its focus today is solely poetry. A small (404 sq ft (37.5 m^{2})), one-room store with towering bookcases, it claims to be the "oldest continuous bookshop" devoted solely to the sale of poetry and poetry criticism.

Over the years, the Grolier became a focus of poetic activity in the Cambridge area, which had become a magnet for American poets because of the influence of Harvard University. Poets such as John Ashbery, Robert Bly, Robert Creeley, Donald Hall, and Frank O'Hara were regulars at the store during their time as undergraduates at Harvard; the poet Conrad Aiken lived upstairs from the store in its early days. Numerous other poets and writers, including Russell Banks, Frank Bidart, William Corbett, E. E. Cummings, T. S. Eliot, Lawrence Ferlinghetti, David Ferry, Fanny Howe, Allen Ginsberg, Denise Levertov, Marianne Moore, Charles Olson, Robert Pinsky, Adrienne Rich, Ruth Stone, James Tate and Franz Wright, have been noted as "friends of the Grolier."

== History ==
The Grolier Book Shop was founded in September 1927 by Adrian Gambet and Gordon Cairnie. The subsequent owner, Louisa Solano, purchased and took over its operation in 1974 after Cairnie's death. The poet-bookseller Arthur Freeman negotiated the sale. In 1990, the Grolier Book Shop became the Grolier Poetry Book Shop, Inc. for tax reasons.

Financially comfortable, Gambet and Cairnie were able to run the business at a loss and were known to give away books and turn a blind eye to theft. Much of the activity at the Grolier under Cairnie's management was of the social kind. Under Solano's ownership, the Grolier became a self-sustaining business with aims to expand the general public's interest in poetry and to honor the diversity of voices. The shop's initial means of support included appraisals and a mail order business, an annual undergraduate poetry reading with poets from 15 colleges, and autograph parties, beginning in 1974 with featured poets such as Gary Miranda. In 1983, the Grolier Poetry Prize Annual was first published. Both readings and the Annual were supported by the Ellen La Forge Memorial Poetry Foundation, formed in 1983 by Jeanne Henle in memory of her sister and inspired by Jim Henle, a friend of the shop. It also funded the costs of six poetry festivals. There was also a basketball and a baseball team organized by the poet Peter Payack.

In its last years under Solano's management, the shop remained a source for rare or obscure titles. The store was the first in New England to stock Language Magazine, the periodical that launched the avant-garde L=A=N=G=U=A=G=E poetry movement.

In 2002, a 75th anniversary celebration by the Poetry Society of America drew a crowd of over 800 people. The Grolier is listed as a "poetry landmark" by the Academy of American Poets.

In 2004, Solano announced that, due to poor health and a decline in sales, the Grolier had to be sold. The causes of the shop's decline included the reach of the internet, inventory management, and the encroachment of chains. In March 2006, the store was sold to Nigerian poet Ifeanyi Menkiti, a professor at Wellesley College. In September 2012, the Grolier Poetry Book Shop celebrated its 85th anniversary, a celebration that continued until September 2013. Owner Menkiti also created the nonprofit Grolier Poetry Foundation to help support the store, as well as local poetry initiatives.

== Gallery ==
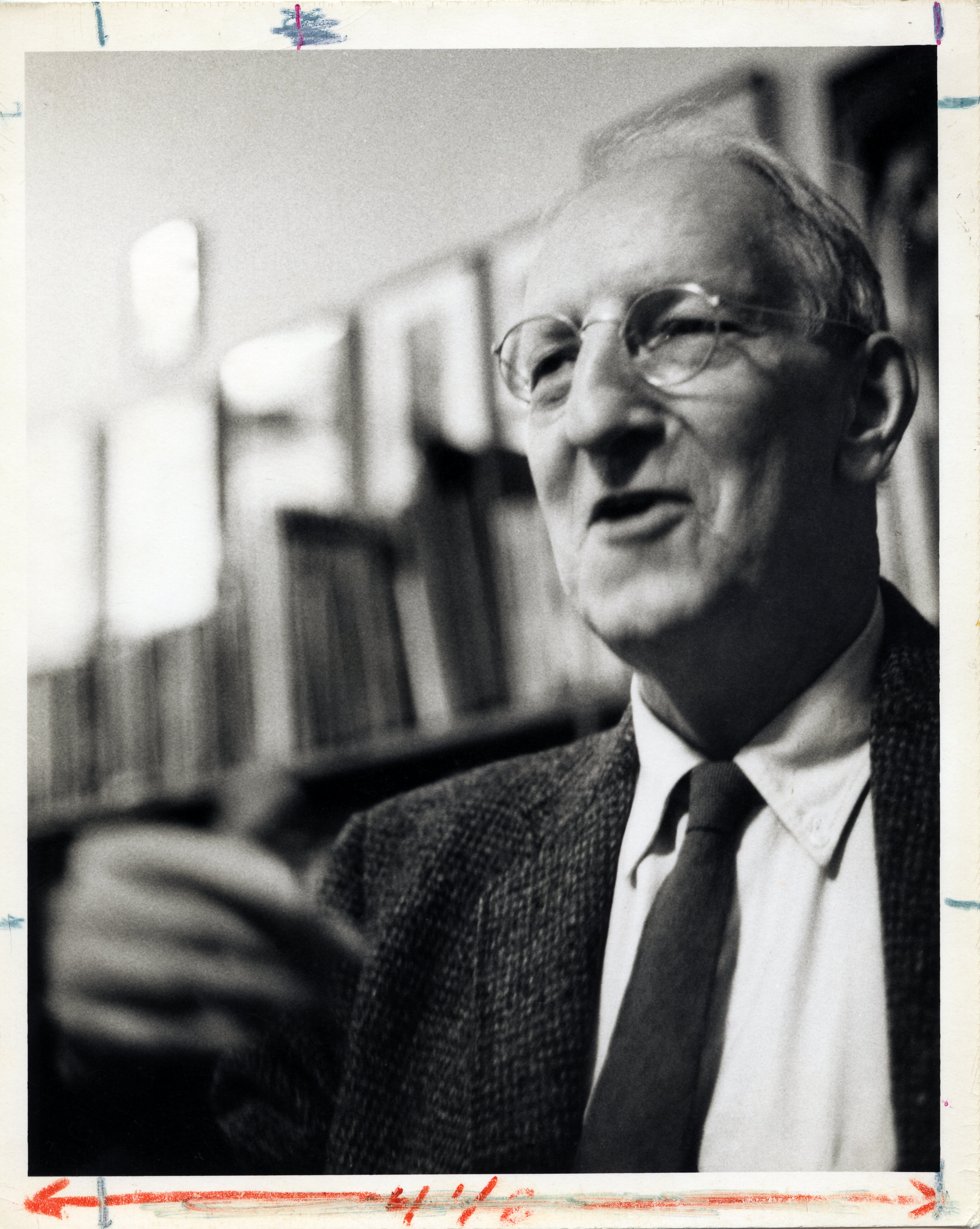
Gordon Cairnie. Photo by Elsa Dorfman.

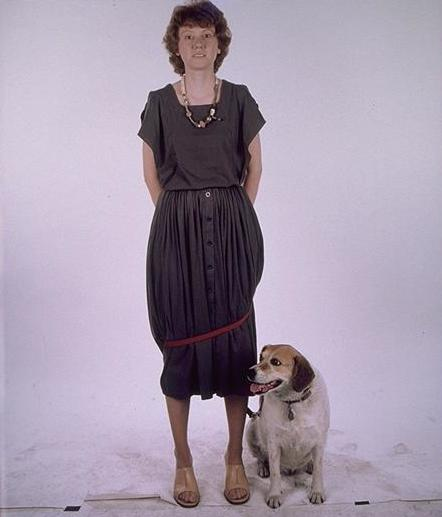
Louisa Solano, owner of the store from 1974 to 2006, and Pumpkin. Portrait taken in 1984 by Elsa Dorfman.

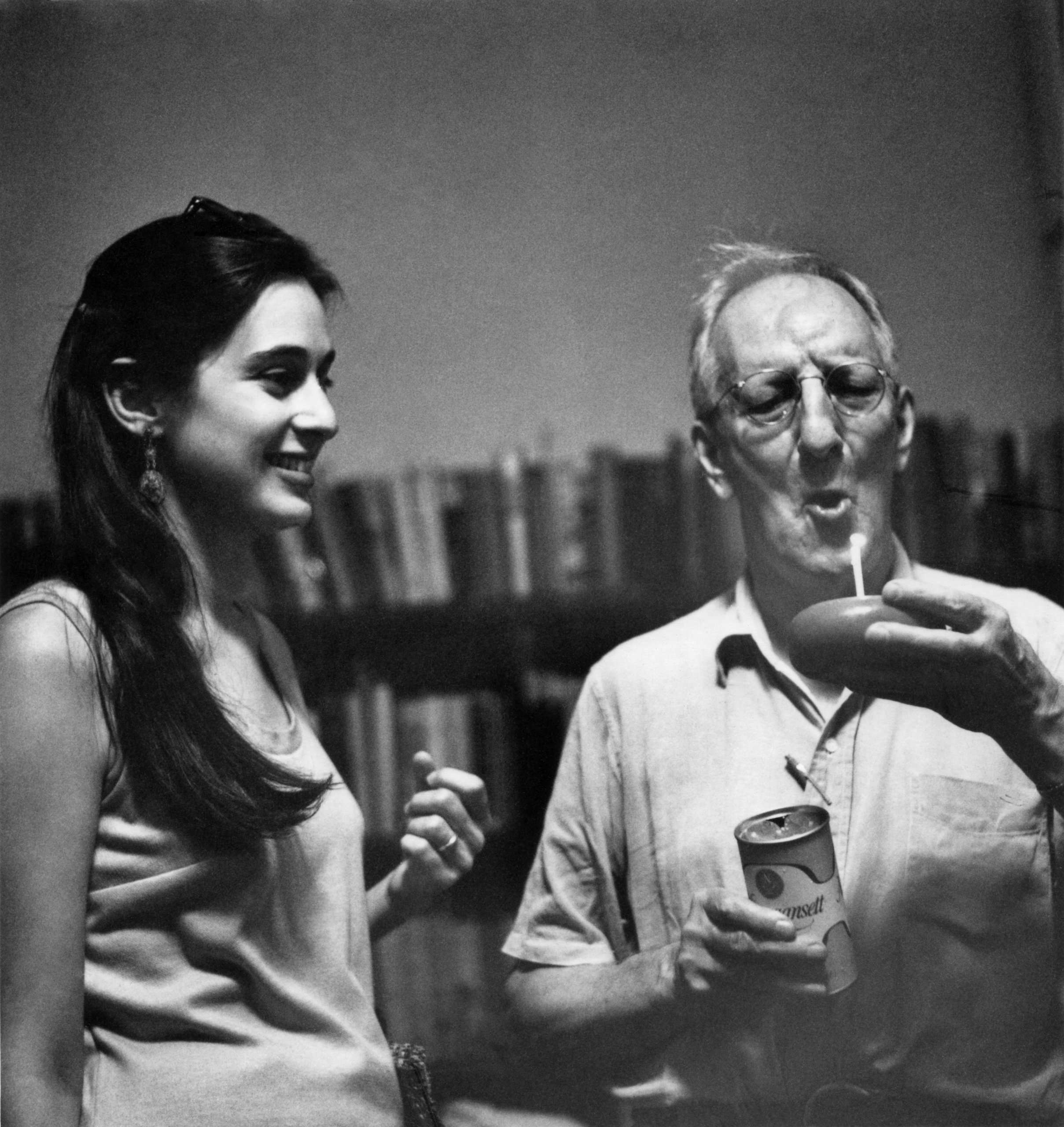
Gail Mazur and Gordon Cairnie at the Grolier in the 1960s.

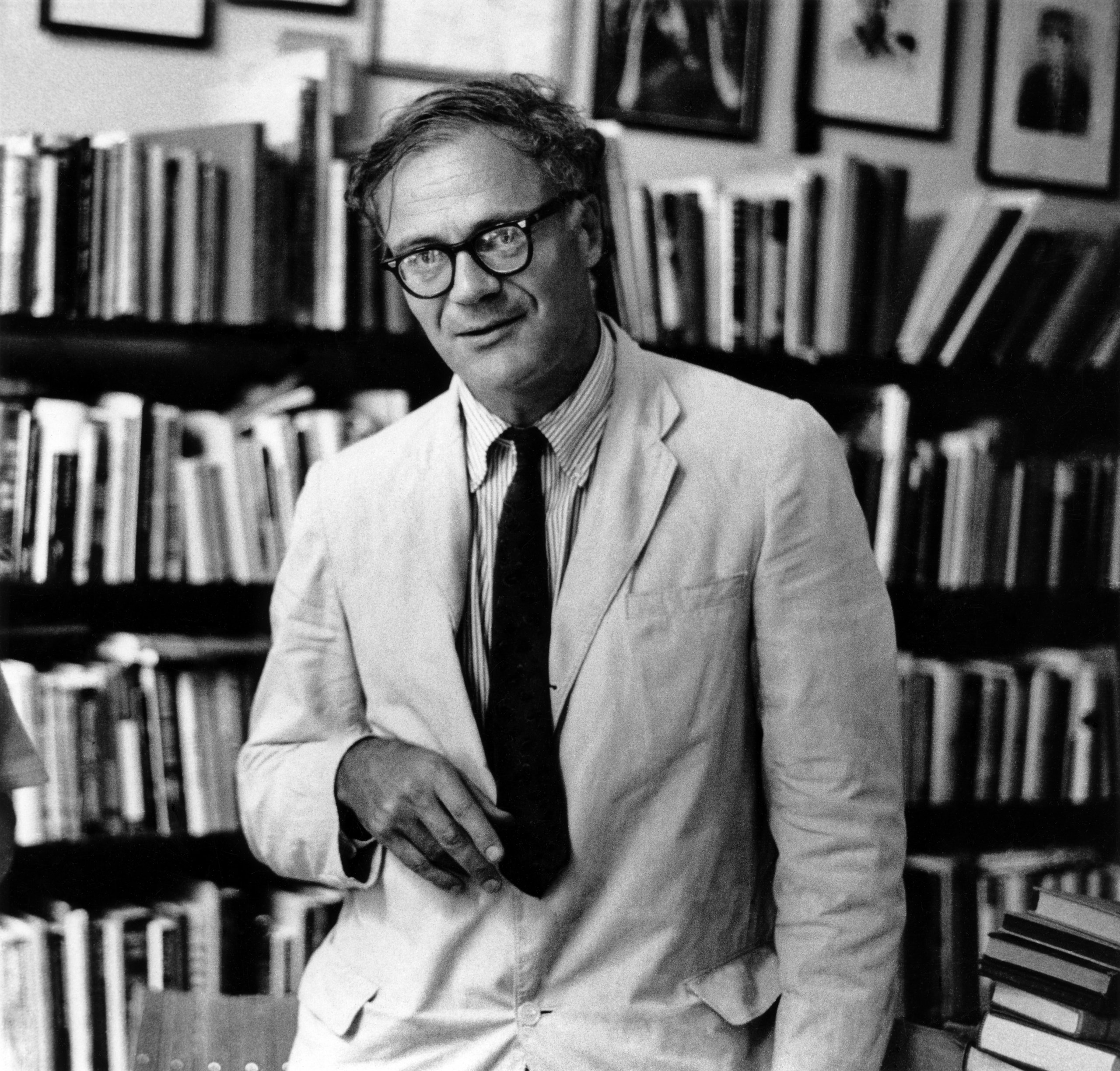
Robert Lowell at the Grolier in the 1960s.

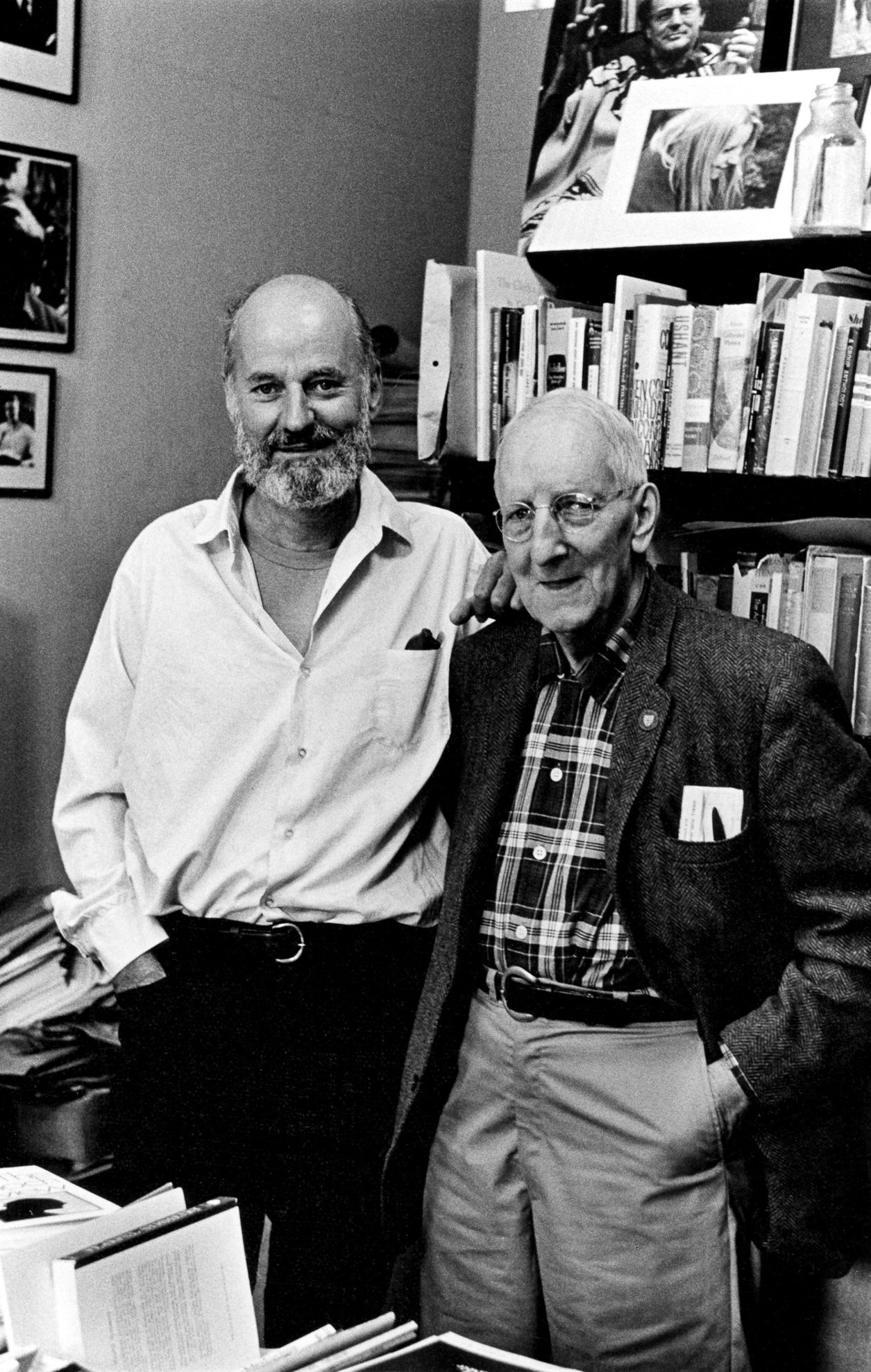
Lawrence Ferlinghetti at the Grolier in the 1960s, with Gordon Cairnie, the owner at the time.

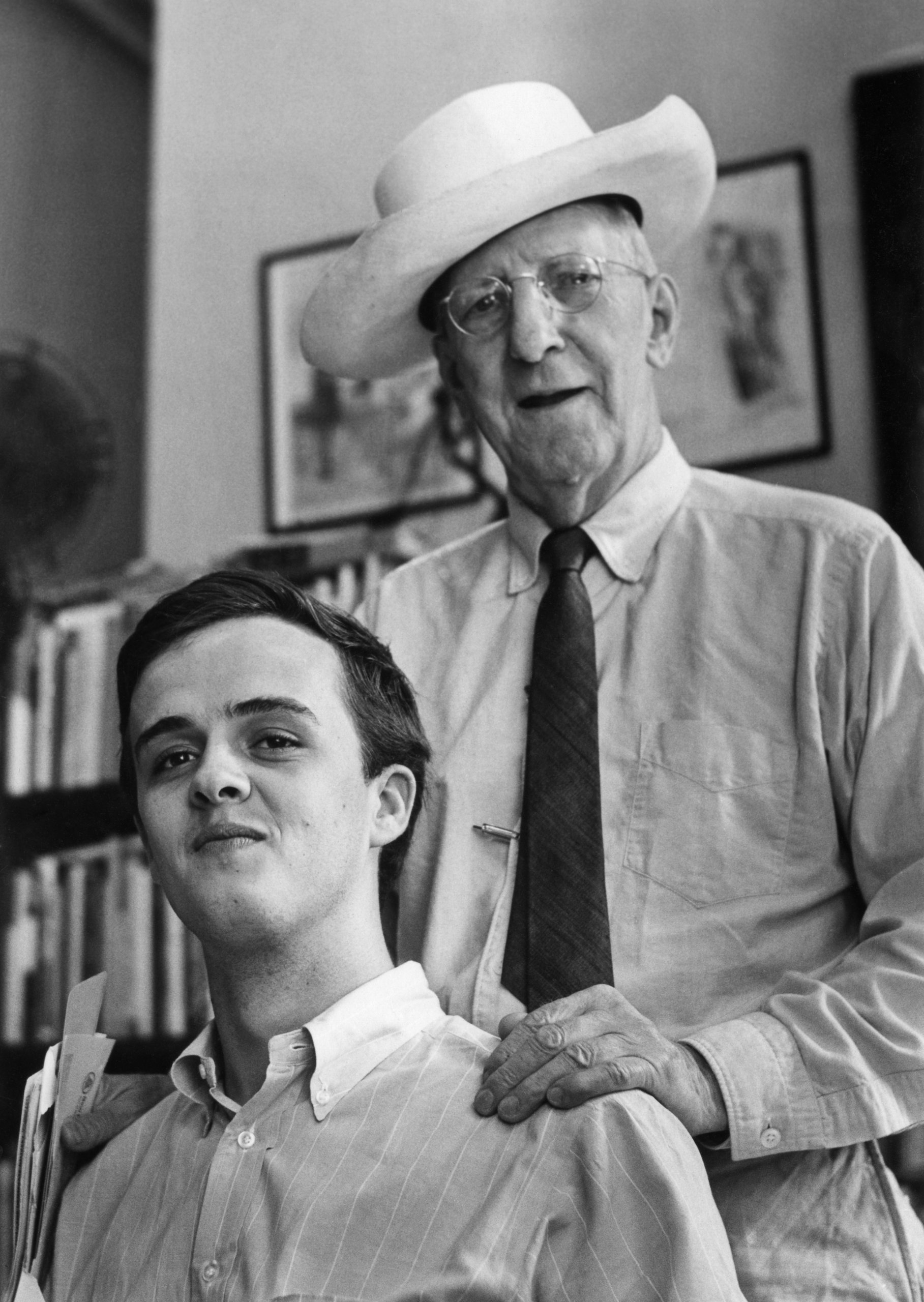
James Tate and Gordon Cairnie at the Grolier in the 1960s.
