= Barbara Noah =

- Born: 1949 (age 76–77)
- Education: Mills College, Pratt Institute
- Known for: painting, printmaking, photography, digital art, sculpture, installation art, public art
- Movement: Contemporary
- Awards: Artist Trust Twining Humber award, the Pollock/Krasner grant, Betty Bowen Merit Award from Seattle Art Museum
- Website: http://www.barbaranoah.com/

Barbara Noah (born 1949) is an artist who currently works with digital prints and mixed media, with past work in public art, photography, painting, print, and sculpture.

== Early life and education ==
Barbara Noah earned a bachelor's degree in art from Mills College in 1971, where she graduated Phi Beta Kappa. She later earned an M.F.A. degree, in painting and serigraphy from Pratt Institute in 1975.

== Career ==
Noah is an artist working on hybrid works (painting, print, photography, digital art, sculpture, installations, public art) who has exhibited in venues such as the Henry Art Gallery, Artists Space, MoMA PS1, the New Museum of Contemporary Art, and the Kala Art Institute. In 1981, Noah's photography appeared in an exhibition alongside Ellen Carey and Cynthia Kanstein at the San Francisco Museum of Modern Art. In 1985, she was commissioned by the Seattle Arts Commission to paint Seattle City Light's Canal Substation.

In 2011, Noah received the Twining Humber Award from Artist Trust.

From 2010 to 2022, Noah taught at the University of Washington, Bothell's School of Interdisciplinary Arts and Sciences. She taught painting, drawing, and mixed-media art classes that combine conceptual and cultural influences. These include possible mixtures of painting, drawing, sculptural components, found objects and materials, assemblage, collage, and other media. She also teaches classes based on concepts like social justice, humor, the narrative, and creativity. At the University of Washington, she also developed and directed an arts-centered study abroad program in Rome.

Noah has also lectured at the University of California, Los Angeles, and California State University, Long Beach. She has contributed writing to Art in America and ARTnews.

In 2023, she created a piece, Life on Mars, for the Museum of Flight in Tukwila, Washington.

== Work ==
Her most recent series, Toss and Turn, was recently exhibited in a solo show at Davidson Galleries in Seattle. The artist describes it as "an ironically titled series of digital pigment prints contemplating climate change and reflecting a personal and cultural desire for transcendent experiences and survival expressed through metaphoric figurative surrogates in terrestrial and distant skies". Toss and Turn was a continuation of an earlier series, Likely Stories, which Noah was able to complete after winning the Twining Humber Award.

== Exhibitions ==
- 2019 Toss and Turn, solo exhibition at Davidson Galleries, Seattle, Washington
- 2018 Making Our Mark, Bellevue Arts Museum, Washington; curated by Michael W. Monroe, Director Emeritus of BAM, Curator-in-Charge of the Renwick Gallery, Smithsonian American Art Museum.
- 2017 Second Annual Fine Art Exhibition, Los Angeles Center of Photography, Los Angeles, California
- 2017 Everyone's in 3D, The Alice Gallery, Seattle, Washington
- 2016 Pressing On, Seattle Print Arts Exhibit, Schack Arts Center, Everett, Washington
- 2015 Fly Me to the Moon, Solo Exhibition at Palazzo Pio, University of Washington Rome Center, Rome, Italy
- 2015 Print + Paper, Bellevue College; juried by Margaret Bullock, Curator of Collections and Special Exhibitions, Tacoma Art Museum
- 2014 Solo Exhibition, Art & Soul, Seattle, Washington
- 2013 CoCA Collision, Center On Contemporary Art, Seattle, Washington
- 2010 Solo Exhibition, Davidson Galleries, Seattle, Washington
- 2008 Smoke and Mirrors, Seattle Art Museum, curated by Marisa Sanchez, Assistant Curator of Modern & Contemporary Art
- 2007 Print!, Seattle Print Art 3rd Biennial, juried by Sarah Suzuki, Asst. Curator, Dept of Prints, Museum of Modern Art, NY; at University of Puget Sound, Tacoma, WA
- 2006 Imprimo, Gallery 110, Seattle, Washington; selected by James Elaine, Curator of Project Series, Hammer Museum, Los Angeles, California
- 2005 Shenzhen Art Institute Gallery, Shenzhen, China
- 2005 North By Northwest: Works On Paper from Seattle Print Arts, Kala Art Institute, Berkeley, California
- 2003 SPA @ SPU, a Juried Print Exhibition; Juror: David Kiehl, Curator of Prints, Whitney Museum of American Art; Art Center Gallery, Seattle Pacific University, Seattle, Washington

=== Awards and nominations ===
- 2011 Irving and Yvonne Twining Humber Award for Lifetime Artistic Achievement, Artist Trust
- 2007 Residency at Kala Institute, Berkeley, California
- 2004 City Artists Award, Office of Arts and Cultural Affairs, City of Seattle
- 1997 Pollock-Krasner Grant, for exceptional quality of work and artistic achievement
