= Natalie White =

American artist

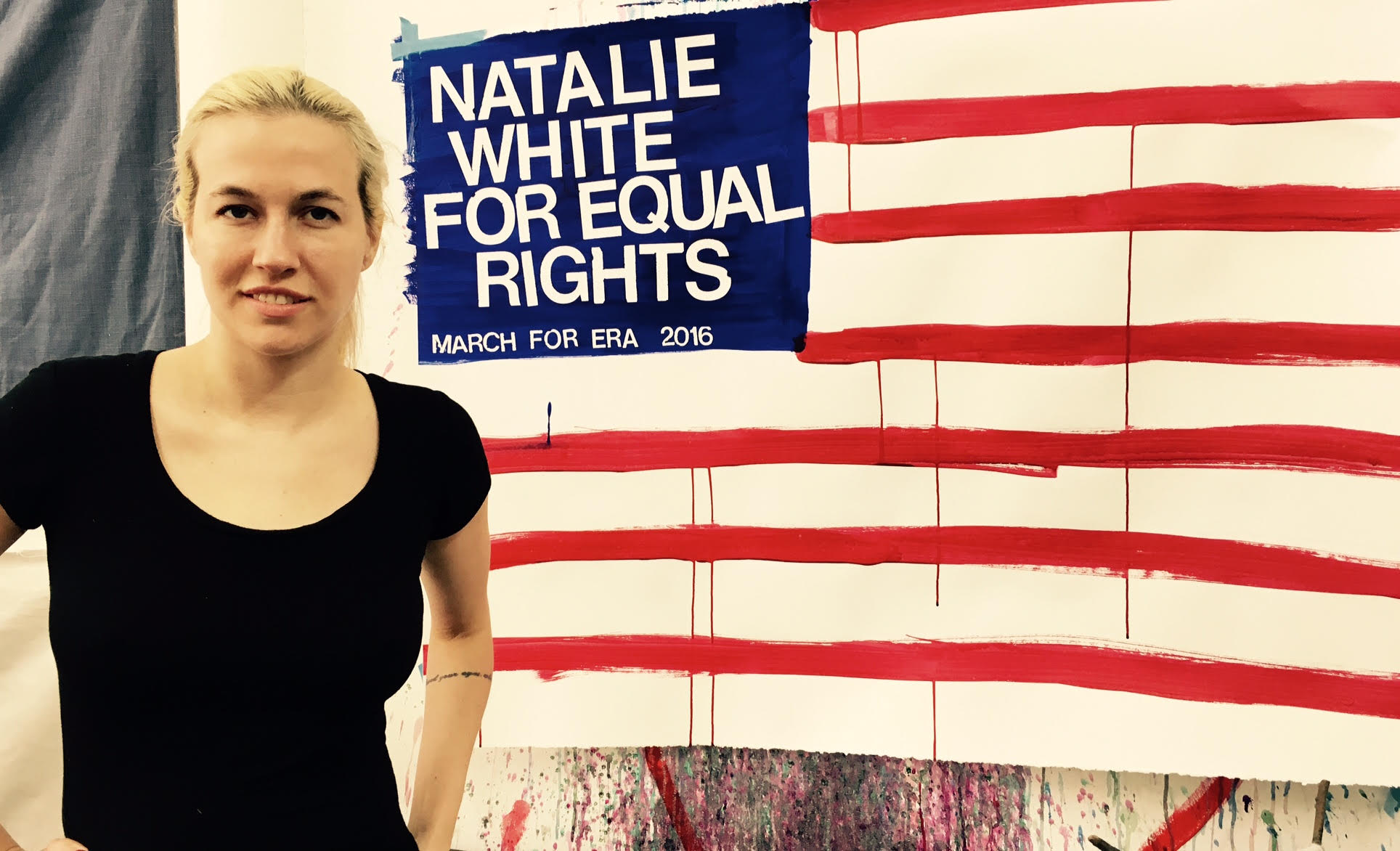
Natalie White posing with a poster for the March For Era in 2016.

Natalie White (born 1988) is an American artist best known for her Giant Polaroid self-portraiture and feminist performance art.

== Early life and education ==
White grew up in Fairmont, West Virginia. She began modeling as a teenager, first for the painter George Condo, then for numerous photographers. Although she has no formal artistic education, she learned form, composition, lighting and the art business from those for whom she modeled.

== Career ==
White began her career as a model for artists including Peter Beard, Will Cotton, and George Condo. She experienced their work together as collaborative; however, becoming disillusioned by not being acknowledged as a creative partner, she began her own path as an artist. She was also, notably, involved in a legal dispute with Beard over rights to portraits he had taken and she produced.

White's work often plays upon her former and current role as a muse and model. She practices self-portraiture and photographs others, often using the Giant Polaroid camera that Beard used. She is frequently called a provocative feminist artist.

Her first solo exhibition, "Who Shot Natalie White?" was in 2013. White's 2017 show A MUSE ME also used the giant polaroid format but featured nude self-portraits, as did her 2018 show "Transmissions from Space". One of the photos from this show sold for over $40,000 in 2024.

White's work was not solely in the photographic medium: her 2016 show "Natalie White for Equal Rights" featured a "life-sized, nude bronze sculpture of the artist in combat boots, hoisting the American flag" and was followed by a 16-day, 250-mile march from New York City to Washington DC to advocate for the Equal Rights Amendment (ERA) to the U.S. Constitution. On arrival in Washington, White wrote "ERA NOW" in chalk on the sidewalk outside of the US Capitol, and was later arrested and charged for her actions. She defended herself in the trial as a form of performance art, the march itself was later presented as a multimedia artwork, and the story was widely covered in the media.

White later moved on to other media, as in her 2021 show The Bleach Paintings, where she used bleach to paint on large sheets of colored cloth. In 2023, she returned to the Giant Polaroid format, this time with portraits of curators and other people from the art world. The title of the exhibition was "The Last Shot", a reference to the dying media, as available film stock for the Giant Polaroid will soon be used up.

== Selected exhibitions ==
- 2013: Who Shot Natalie White? (New York’s Rox Arts Gallery)
- 2013: Featured artist in Lady Gaga’s Born This Way Foundation benefit. Miami Beach, Florida.
- 2015: Natalie White: Instant Gratification (The Hole)
- 2017: A MUSE ME
- 2018: Transmissions from Space, Chelsea.
- 2021: The Bleach Paintings (Freight+Volume Gallery, New York)
- 2023: The Last Shot (Ethan Cohen Gallery at the KuBe Art Center in Beacon, New York)
- 2024: Virginia Sins (with Issa Salliander), Galeria Hilario Galguera, Mexico.
