= Marita Dingus =

American artist (born 1956)

- Born: 1956 (age 69–70); Seattle
- Education: Tyler School of Art at Temple University (BFA), San Jose State University (MFA)
- Known for: Sculptures made from recycled and found objects, environmental artist
- Style: Mixed Media
- Spouse: Preston Hampton
- Awards: Irving and Yvonne Twining Humber Award for Lifetime Artistic Achievement
- Website: maritadingus.com

Marita Dingus (born 1956) is an African-American artist who works in multimedia, using found objects.

== Early life and education ==
Born in Seattle, Washington, in 1956, Dingus earned a BFA in 1980 from Tyler School of Art at Temple University in Philadelphia, and an MFA at San Jose State University in 1985.

She married Preston Hampton in 2012.

== Career ==
Untitled Bowl (2005), Smithsonian American Art Museum, on loan from the Boise Art Museum

Early in her career Dingus was represented by Portland, Oregon's Fountain Gallery, which was helpful in getting her work out to a much wider audience.

=== Critical reception ===
Dingus' work has been favorably reviewed by critics. New York Times critic Ken Johnson noted Dingus is "a worthy lesser-known talent." Tacoma News Tribune critic Rosemary Ponnekanti wrote, "Seattle artist Marita Dingus opens the Kittredge Gallery season with 'They Still Hold Us,' work that, through discarded and cast-off materials, references the persistence of cultural injustices that affect people of color."

The Museum of Glass described Dingus' art from found objects: "Throughout her career, Dingus has chosen to make her creations with recycled materials, which adds an essential element to her already multi-layered and thought-provoking pieces. Exhibiting internationally and locally, Dingus’ work is a commentary on the slave trade, recycling, and the politics of poverty."

Regina Hackett of the Seattle Post-Intelligencer said, "Seattle's Dingus is open-minded about what constitutes her material. Basically, it's whatever she lays her hands on and includes zippers, strips of cloth, light-bulb sockets, paper clips, tooth guards, paint brushes, bits of wire, computer innards, bent silverware, pacifiers, colored tape, paint, plastic and coarse thread." Hackett added, "After two residencies at Pilchuck Glass School, she's making singular use of the medium. Some of her babies have glass faces with painted features, others have glass torsos also, fat and silky forms with an inherent sense of wiggle. It's a pleasure to walk into the room and feel these forms in active engagement around you."

=== Artist statement ===
“I consider myself an African-American Feminist and environmental artist. My approach to producing art is environmentally and politically infused: neither waste humanity nor the gifts of nature. I am primarily a mixed media sculptor who uses discarded materials. My art draws upon relics from the African Diaspora. The discarded materials represent how people of African descent were used during the institution of slavery and colonialism then discarded, but who found ways to repurpose themselves and thrive in a hostile world. I seek to use recovered materials, reconfiguring and incorporating them into pieces of art where possible and appropriate, and to mitigate waste and pollution in all my work. This is a creative challenge, but a commitment I incorporate into my professional and personal activities.”

=== Awards ===
In 2018, Artist Trust announced Dingus as the recipient of the Irving and Yvonne Twining Humber Award for Lifetime Artistic Achievement. In 2017 she was named a Legacy Artist (Experimental Media) of the Museum of Northwest Art. She was also honored in 2005 with the Morris and Joan Alhadeff PONCHO Artist of the Year award. Earlier in her career, she received a Visual Art Fellowship from the Artist Trust in 1994, and a John S. Guggenheim Fellowship in 1999.

=== Selected public artworks and collections ===
- Washington's State Art Collection (ArtsWA | Washington State Art Collection)
- Tacoma Art Museum, Tacoma, WA
- Seattle Art Museum, Seattle, WA
- "Winds of Change: We Are Still Here" by Marita Dingus & Preston Hampton, a public art commission for Jackson Apartments, Vulcan Real Estate, Seattle, WA
- Museum of Glass, Tacoma, WA
- Douglass-Truth Branch Art, Seattle Public Library, Seattle, WA
- Whatcom Museum, Bellingham, WA
- "Recycled Child" (2009), a public art commission at Seattle Central College in Seattle, Washington, that is part of Washington's State Art Collection.
