= Frederick Ferdinand Schafer =

German-born American painter

- Born: August 16, 1839; Braunschweig, Germany
- Died: July 18, 1927 (aged 87); Oakland, California, U.S.
- Occupation: Painter
- Spouse: Sophia Schafer
- Children: 1 son, 1 daughter

Frederick Ferdinand Schafer (August 16, 1839 – July 18, 1927) was a German-born American painter. He was born in Braunschweig, Germany and he emigrated to the United States in 1876, at age 37. He opened a studio on Montgomery Street in San Francisco, and he lived in Oakland, Over the course of his career, he did over 500 paintings. He died in Oakland at age 87. His work is in the permanent collections of the British Columbia Archives, the Birmingham Museum of Art, the Fairfield University Art Museum, and the Northwest Museum of Arts and Culture.

== Selected works ==
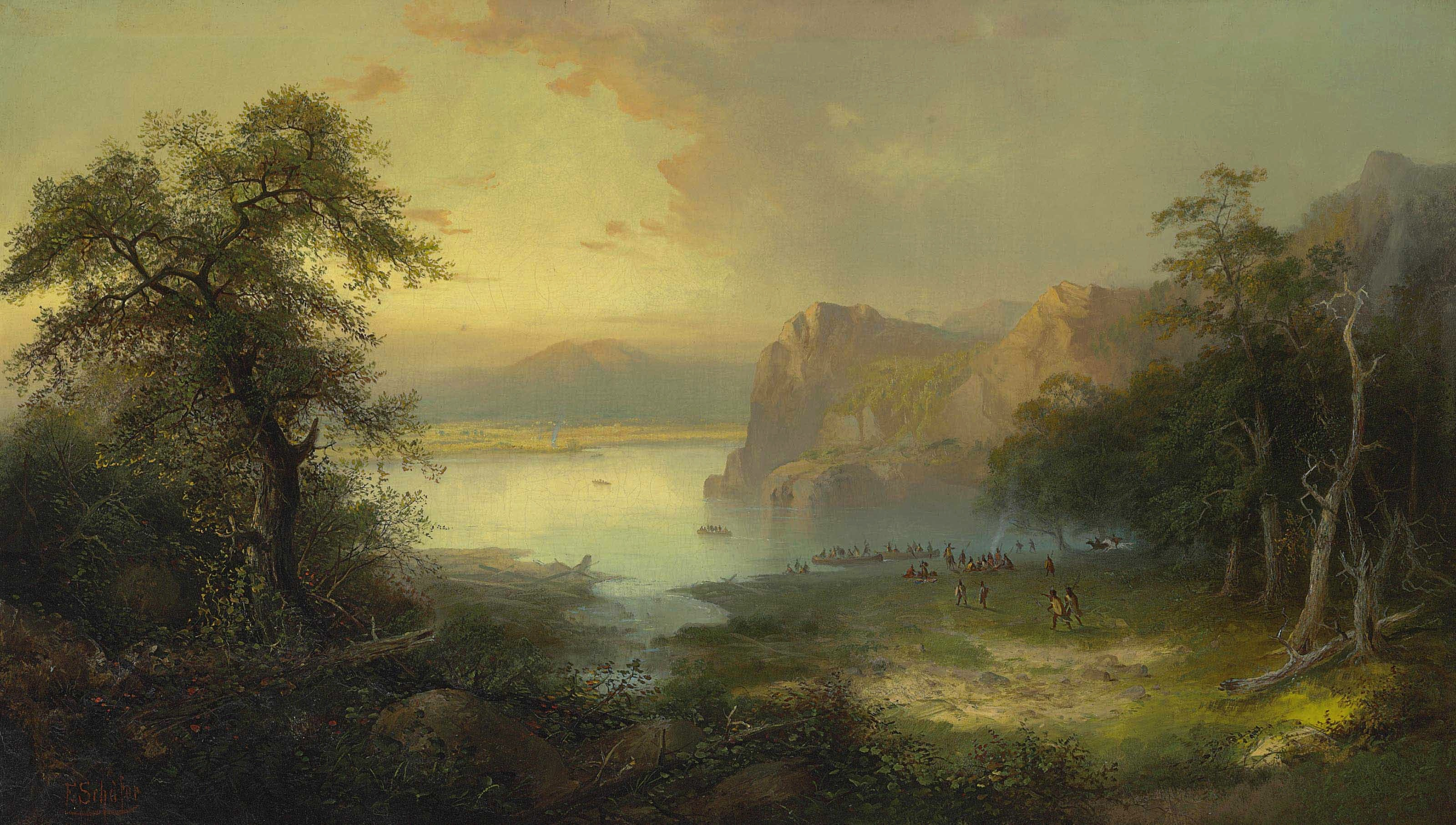
Indians on the Warpath

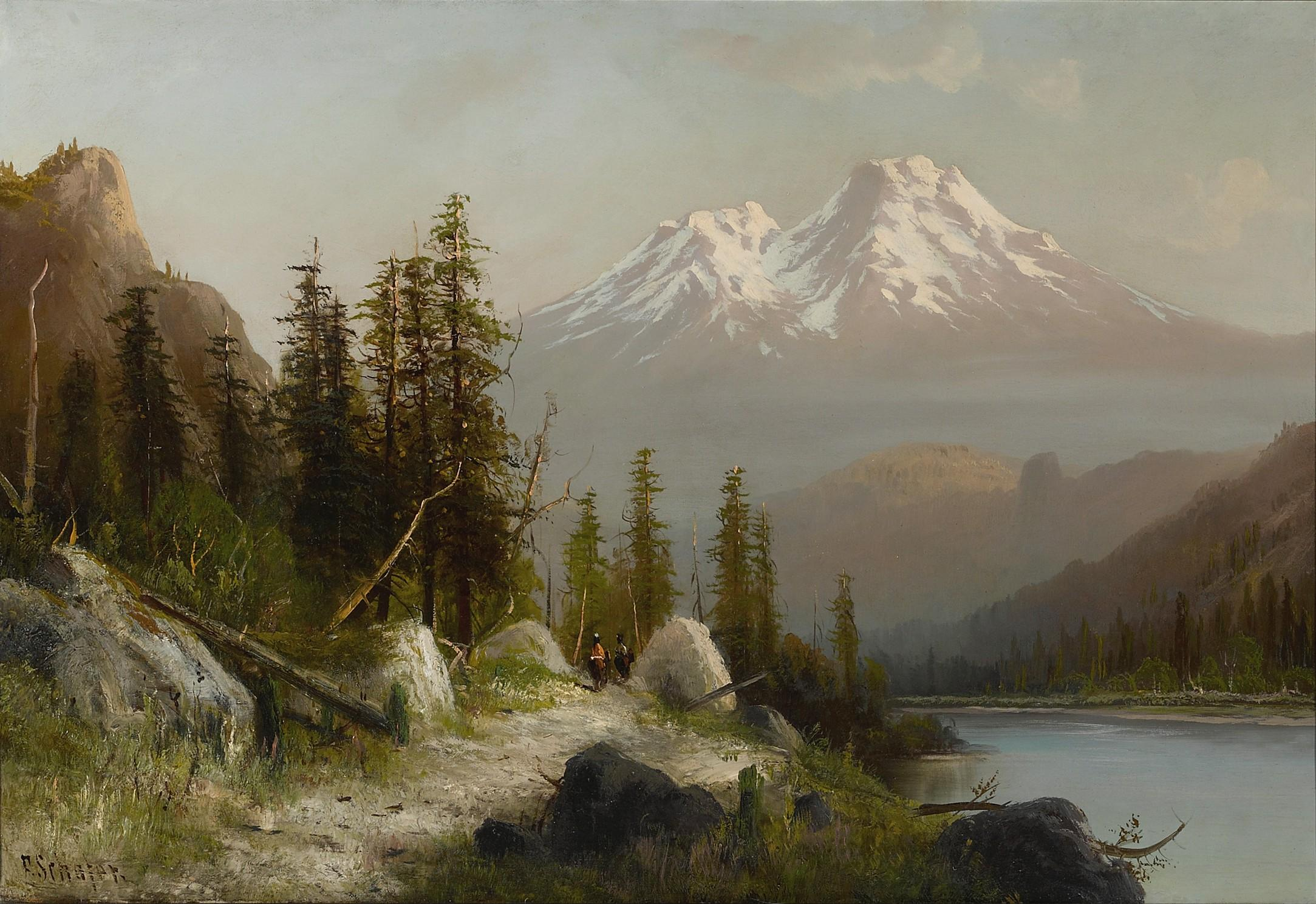
Morning on Mount Shasta, 14,400 feet high from Shasta Lake, California

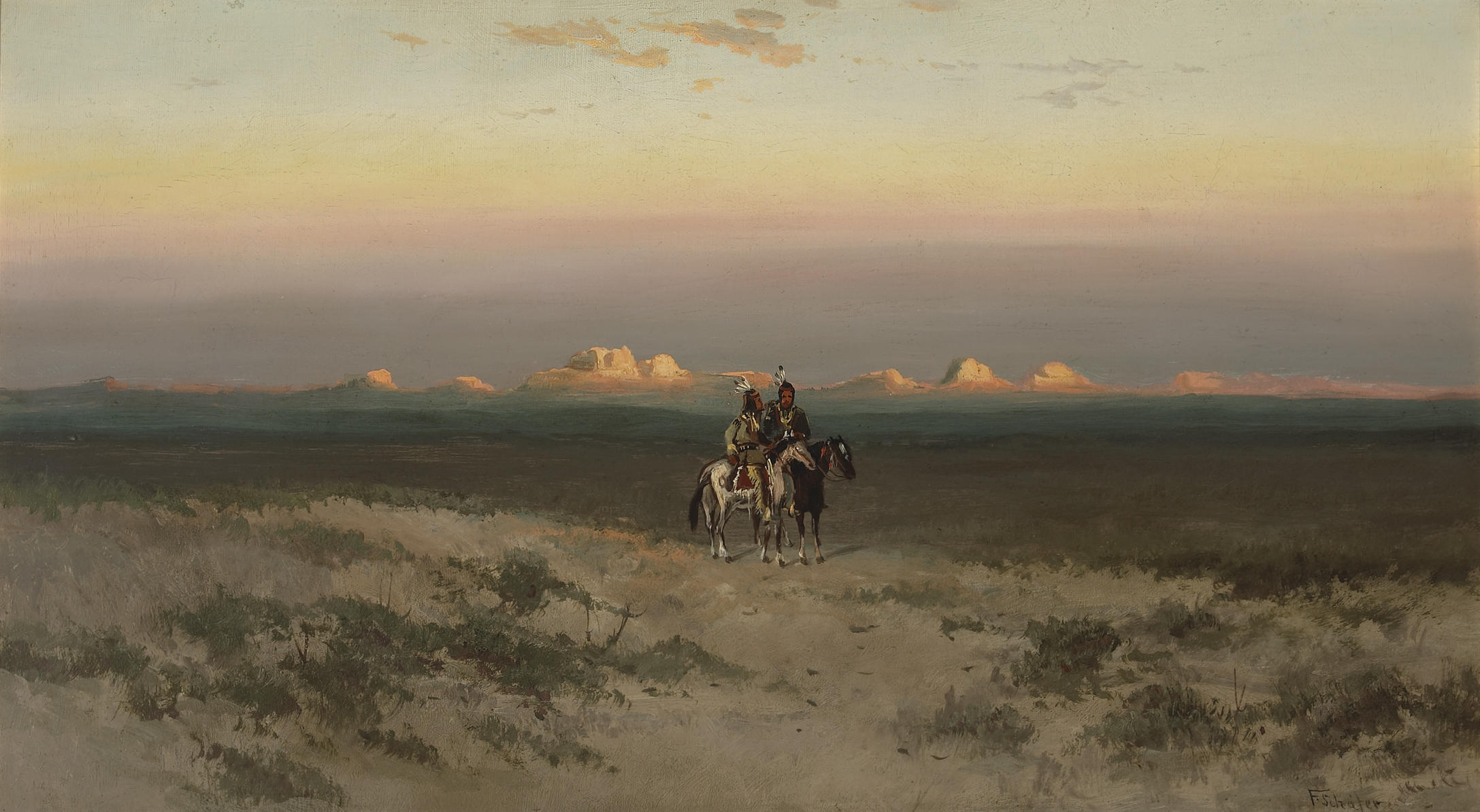
Two Indians in the Utah Desert

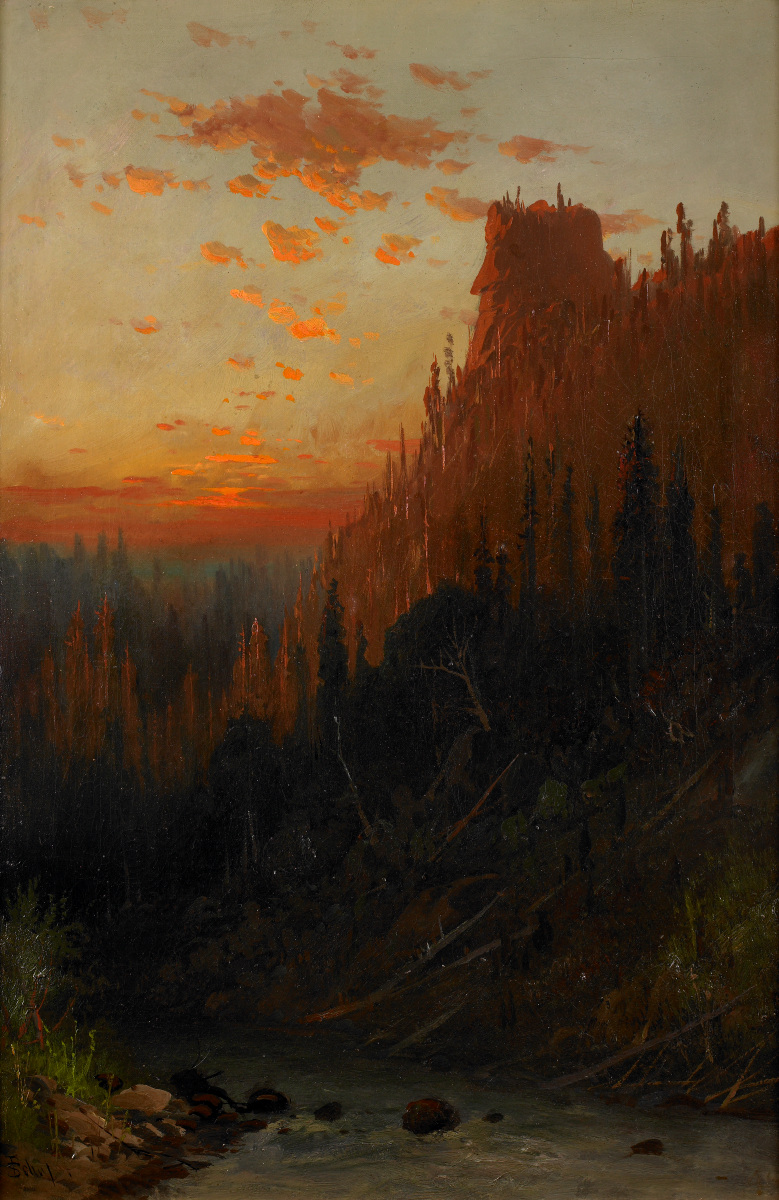
Old Roscoe on the Truckee River (c. 1885)

== General references ==
- "Frederick Ferdinand Schafer(1839–1927) : A Preliminary Catalog of his Paintings". OCLC 921307087.
