= Ellen Carey =

American artist and photographer

- Born: New York City, New York, US
- Education: State University of New York at Buffalo, Kansas City Art Institute
- Known for: Photography, Conceptual art
- Awards: National Endowment for the Arts; Polaroid Artists Support Program; Andy Warhol Foundation
- Website: Ellen Carey

Ellen Carey, Self-Portrait, Polaroid 20 x 24 color positive print, 24" x 20" (image)/34" x 22" (object), 1986. Wadsworth Atheneum Museum of Art collection.

Ellen Carey is an American artist known for conceptual photography that explores non-traditional approaches involving process, exposure and paper. Her work has ranged from painted and multiple-exposure, Polaroid 20 x 24, Neo-Geo self-portraits beginning in the late 1970s to cameraless, abstract photograms and minimal Polaroid images from the 1990s onward, which critics compare to color-field painting. Los Angeles Times critic Leah Ollman describes her photography as "inventive, physically involving, process-oriented work" and her photograms as "performative sculptures enacted in the gestational space of the darkroom," whose pure hues, shadows and color shifts deliver "optical buzz and conceptual bang." New York Times critic William Zimmer wrote that her work "aspires to be nothing less than a reinvention, or at least a reconsideration, of the roots or the essence of photography."

Carey's solo exhibitions have been presented at museums including the Amon Carter Museum of American Art, International Center of Photography (ICP), New Britain Museum of American Art, Fox Talbot Museum (UK) and Wadsworth Atheneum Museum of Art, and alternative spaces such as Hallwalls and Real Art Ways. Her work belongs to the museum collections of the Metropolitan Museum of Art, Whitney Museum of American Art, Los Angeles County Museum of Art, Centre Pompidou, and Smithsonian American Art Museum, among others. In 2019, she was named one of the Royal Photographic Society (London) "Hundred Heroines" recognizing leading women photographers worldwide. In addition to her art career, Carey is an associate professor of photography at the Hartford Art School and a writer and researcher on the history of photography.

== Life and career ==
Carey was born in New York City. She studied at the Art Students League of New York (1970) before attending the Kansas City Art Institute, where she earned a BFA in 1975. She was part of a mid-1970s Buffalo, NY avant-garde while in graduate school at the State University of New York at Buffalo (MFA, 1978). It included artists Cindy Sherman, Robert Longo and Charles Clough and spawned the alternative spaces Hallwalls and Center for Exploratory and Perceptual Arts (CEPA), each of which held exhibitions of her early painted self-portraits. In 1979, after receiving a CAPS grant, she moved to New York City and rented a studio in Soho. She was one of the first artists invited into the Polaroid Corporation's program to sponsor artists interested in exploring the potential of its "instant film"; the technology played a key role in her Neo-Geo, post-psychedelic self-portraits of the 1980s and her later "Photography Degree Zero" abstract work.

During her first decade in New York, Carey was featured in shows at PS1 ("The Altered Photograph", 1979), the New Museum, White Columns, the Albright-Knox Art Gallery, the Bronx Museum of Art, the São Paulo Biennale ("The Heroic Figure", traveling 1984-6), The Alternative Museum, and ICP, among others. Her one-person exhibitions include a ten-year survey at ICP (1987), and shows at the Center for Photography at Woodstock (1996), Real Art Ways (2000), Museum of Contemporary Photography (2002), Wadsworth Atheneum Museum of Art (2004), Lyman Allyn Art Museum (2006), the Amon Carter Museum (2018) and New Britain Museum (2023). She appeared in the international traveling exhibit, "The Polaroid Project: At the Intersection of Art and Technology" (2017–20) and the surveys, "Controlling the Chaos" (Carnegie Museum of Art, 2020) and "Alter Egos|Projected Selves" (Metropolitan Museum of Art, 2021).

Since 1991, Carey has divided time between living and working in Hartford, Connecticut and New York City.

Ellen Carey, Color Theory, Polaroid 20 x 24 color positive print, 24" x 20", 1995. Private Collection.

== Work ==
Critic and curator Lyle Rexer identifies Carey as among the "most committed experimental photographers" in the United States; her explorations span black-and-white self-portraits embellished with paint, psychedelic portraits and abstract works made with the Polaroid 20 x 24, and cameraless, abstract photograms. She has experimented with the medium's chemical, light-related, color and material properties, often rejecting its documentary dimension and hierarchical relations of subject and object in favor of possibilities residing between painting and sculpture, realized through the manipulation of process and printing. Her work references a wide-range of movements, including Op Art and Neo-Geo, Neo-Expressionism, Surrealism and Dada, Minimalism, Conceptual art, feminism and performance art. Carey's art can be organized into three major categories: early self-portraits and portraits; abstract photograms she collectively titles, "Struck by Light"; and abstract, Polaroid-based works she titles, "Photography Degree Zero."

=== Early self-portraits and portraits (1976–1988) ===
In a review of Carey's 1987 survey at ICP, Art in America critic Stephen Westfall described her self-portraits and portraits as "vastly underrated" work that proposed a merging of human form with metaphysical energies, made visible on the photographs through painted marks, light pens, and superimposed psychedelic and geometric patterns. Her early works were black-and-white, gender-specific images whose dramatic poses and lighting and expressive marks suggested emotional states of pain, vulnerability or self-assurance and organic, ritualistic scenarios.

In 1984, she turned to brilliantly hued, multiple-exposure color images, made with one of only five existing Polaroid 20 × 24 cameras, which were cooler, androgynous, and more aesthetically seductive. This work departed from traditional portraiture in no longer seeking to capture the character or identity of its subjects; rather, Carey or others served as de-individualized stand-ins for the human spirit, seamlessly disappearing into and merging with Op Art and Pop patterns evoking technology, biology, consciousness, time, and perhaps artificial intelligence. Critics such as Barry Schwabsky suggested that the specific qualities of the patterns opened interpretive possibilities and raised notions of the self, variously, as infinitely complex, unknowable, fractured, constructed from readymade cultural forms, or spiritually seeking.

Ellen Carey, Dings & Shadows, Color (C-Print) unique photogram, 24" x 20", 2013. Private Collection, New York, NY.

=== "Struck by Light": Photograms (1989– ) ===
Carey began creating cameraless photograms in 1989, which specifically explored abstraction and conceptual issues at the basis of photography, through a process embracing chance, improvisation, and risk. Photograms date back to the dawn of photography, in work by mid-19th-century artists Anna Atkins and William Henry Fox Talbot—and later, Man Ray—who placed botanical specimens, salt, silver or other objects onto light-sensitive paper to create "shadow" images. Carey creates hers in total darkness using photosensitive paper, which she crumples, creases, obscures or filters and exposes to light, creating color, shadow and depth effects that record her actions (e.g., Color Theory, 1995). She began with black-and–white photograms, before shifting to muted color images that New York Times reviews said exalted in new techniques as they moved further into abstraction toward "a kind of photographic minimalism".

In 2000, she began producing brightly hued photograms whose series titles reflected the objects or materials she used to interrupt or strike the paper (e.g., "Push Pins", "Penlights") or referenced visual phenomena, such as afterimages ("Blinks"). Reviewers describe her color photograms as "hyper-saturated, jewel-toned abstraction" suggesting light candies, paper diamonds or asymmetrical kaleidoscopes, in which color is the subject itself; they compare their fluid soaks of color to the stain painting of Helen Frankenthaler and Morris Louis and the painterly, draped fabric of Frans Hals and John Singer Sargent. Considering them conceptually, Leah Ollman wrote, "Throughout this body of work, the paper's surface does double duty as object and subject, material and image. The literal and the abstract merge."

Carey's "Caesura" series (2016–18) features vertical breaks in color along central axes with fine, radiating vein-like fissures that she creates by creasing or accordion-folding the paper. The "Dings & Shadows" series (2010– ) introduces greater compositional range with dense surfaces of wrinkles and crumples ("dings") occurring at all angles, which Carey draws out with a penlight to create shadow and depth; she has often exhibited them in installations of up to twenty panels. Her "Zerograms" (2018) reflect elements of her parallel "Pulls" series, incorporating a stark, geometric void in their centers that suggests a new sense of illusory space.

Ellen Carey, Crush & Pull, Polaroid 20 x 24 color positive—unique, triptych, 80" x 22" (each)/80" x 66" (all), 2019.

=== "Photography Degree Zero" (1996– ) ===
"Photography Degree Zero" comprises Carey's experimental, darkroom-less work using a large-format Polaroid 20 x 24 camera, which explores the possibilities of minimalist photography. These images—made without reference to a subject—defy fundamental expectations of "picture taking" through an image-making technique that she discovered, which exploits random developing emulsion flows by pulling the film from the camera (the "Pulls" series) and interrupting the dye-transfer process; in other cases, she rolls back the film, creating multiple exposures ("Rollbacks"), or mixes incompatible emulsions or developer to manipulate the process.

The resulting scroll-like, unframed panels feature conical loops or tongues of single colors plus black, white or gray (in panel groupings, multiple colors occur in a single work); they have introduced a unique form to the medium, the parabola. Her early "Pulls" often used a subdued palette, as in the three installations, Mourning Wall (2000), Birthday Portrait (1997) and Family Portrait (1996), which expressed grief over family losses; William Zimmer described the diverse textures of Mourning Wall's gray slabs as achieving the effect of relief sculpture. Her later "Pulls" and related series often incorporate startling flares or "waterfalls" of bright, sometimes overlapping color against blazing white grounds.

Critics suggest they recall the monochrome "swoops" of Ellsworth Kelly or the lozenges and plumes of color-field painters Morris Louis and Larry Poons. In addition to presenting the positive Polaroid images, Carey is singular in also presenting the peeled-off negatives as works of equivalent artistic substance. Reviewers describe these elemental positive and negative works—borne of life-changing loss and existential crisis for Carey—as an emptying out of the image in which the process itself becomes the subject seen in the final, immediate result. Artforum's Barry Schwabsky wrote that unlike some abstract photography, this work "represents a real disruption of the assumed link between photographic image and referent."

Carey showed new "Pulls" alongside older work in the solo exhibitions "Light Struck" (Fox Talbot Museum, 2023) and "Struck by Light" (New Britain Museum, 2023–24), the largest survey to date of her photograms and lens-based prints. The shows included her Crush & Pull with Hands & Penlights works (2022–23) made using a Polaroid 20 x 24 instant camera, which reflect black space, spooling lightning flashes of color, and amorphous forms with darting hands.

== Collections and recognition ==
Carey's work is in the permanent collections of the Albright-Knox Art Gallery, Art Institute of Chicago, Centre Pompidou, Eskenazi Museum of Art, Fox Talbot Museum, George Eastman Museum, Henry Art Gallery, Los Angeles County Museum of Art, Metropolitan Museum of Art, New Britain Museum, San Francisco Museum of Modern Art, Smithsonian American Art Museum, Whitney Museum, and William Benton Museum of Art, as well as private collections. Her work has been included in art historical books including Light and Lens: Photography in the Digital Age (2018), The Polaroid Project: At the Intersection of Art & Technology (2017), The Polaroid Years: Instant Photography and Experimentation (2013), The Edge of Vision: The Rise of Abstraction in Photography (2013), Color: American Photography Transformed (2013), A Century of Colour Photography: From the Autochrome to the Digital Age (2009), and A History of Women Photographers (1994).

In 2019, the Royal Photographic Society (London) named Carey one of its "Hundred Heroines" commemorating international women photographers. Carey has received awards from the Andy Warhol Foundation (2017, for a retrospective exhibition and book at the Burchfield Penney Art Center), the Polaroid Artists Support Program (1983-8, 2002), Connecticut Commission on the Arts (1998, 2001), New York State Federation for Artists (1986), Massachusetts Council on the Arts (1986), and National Endowment for the Arts (1984), among others.

== Research and academia ==
Carey has written about and researched art-related topics such as the history of photography (including the first women photographer, Anna Atkins), color theory, and tetrachromacy and its relation to gender. She has published essays on Sol LeWitt ("Color Me Real", in Sol LeWitt: 100 Views), Man Ray ("At Play with Man Ray" in Aperture, which focused on her discovery of Ray's "hidden" signature in the 1935 photograph Space Writings (Self-Portrait)), and her own work (in The Polaroid Years and The Polaroid Project). Her research also informed a traveling exhibition she curated, "Women in Colour: Anna Atkins, Color Photography & Those Struck by Light" (2017, 2019).

Carey has taught photography at the Hartford Art School since 1985. She has also taught at Bard College, the International Center for Photography, and Queens College, and been an artist-in-residence at Loughborough University in the United Kingdom.
