= Ross Palmer Beecher =

American artist (born 1957)

- Born: Dawn A. Beecher; 1957 (age 68–69); Greenwich, Connecticut
- Education: Rhode Island School of Design
- Known for: Art from found objects, especially discarded metals

Ross Palmer Beecher (born 1957) is a contemporary mixed media artist who creates "quilts, flags, portraits of famous film directors and American folk heroes, and other types of objects from aluminum cans and found objects". She lives and works in Seattle.

== Early life and education ==
Ross Palmer Beecher was born in Greenwich, Connecticut, in 1957. She studied painting, printmaking, and illustration at the Rhode Island School of Design in Providence. She left school after two years to move to Seattle, where she took odd jobs, "deli work, parking cars, and working in a laundromat". In 1999, Matthew Kangas outlined Beecher's personal and artistic development over the 17-year period after she left the Rhode Island School of Design. After multiple odd jobs, she began creating metal-and-mixed-media wall sculptures from materials she found while riding her bicycle in Seattle: "gas caps, bottle caps, auto tail light fragments, and empty soft drink cans". In the mid 1980s, "folk art-inspired exhibitions in Texas, Illinois, Louisiana, and California" invited her participation. She accepted a position in 1993 as Artist in Residence at Bailey-Boushay House for patients with HIV/AIDS.

== Critical reception ==
Beecher’s strict formal control and rigid symmetry are the foundational skeleton of her art. However, within the quilt grids, all hell breaks loose: spirals, sunbursts, maze shapes, diamonds and circles all have their day as our apprehension of each piece reveals license plates, paint tubes, olive oil cans, aerosol paint cans and other cast-offs.

— Matthew Kangas

Beecher's art has been well-received by critics. According to Kangas, her artworks "gained regional and national attention in galleries, museums, and private and public art collections".

While her art is inspired by American folk art forms such as "quilting, flag-making, bricolage, and primitive portraiture", she is not a folk artist. Kangas wrote that her early art has links to the work of unlettered artists but is "quirky enough (in technique and subject) to separate her out from true Outsider or folk art".

Judy Wagonfeld of the Seattle Post-Intelligencer said of her work, "Stitching scavenged fabric, wood and metal, she crafts offbeat flags and Americana rife with satire. What appears simple turns convoluted. It's as though you order a corn dog and get esoteric polenta with prosciutto". According to Wagonfeld, her works pay homage to the folk art genre, while satirizing the elitist art world, and her glitzy metal quilts honor women's work as art.

Reviewing a 2014 installation at Greg Kucera Gallery in Seattle, Kangas noted Beecher's art is "an utterly unique amalgam of folk art, Pop Art and engaged social-political art". Kangas notes her largest works are a "nod, both droll and commemorative to Jasper Johns and Joseph Albers". Kangas comments that while he wants Beecher to explode more beyond the tight quilt grids, her works have a "substantial material presence" that carries her concepts.

== Selected exhibitions ==
- Quilts, Greg Kucera Gallery, Seattle (2014)
- Black Art, Seattle Art Museum, Seattle, curated by Sandra Jackson Dumont (2008)
- Art of Recycling, Hallie Ford Museum, Salem, Oregon (2006)
- Art in Embassies Program, US Embassy, Austria (2006)
- AMERICANA: Quilts, Flags and Famous Folk, Greg Kucera Gallery, Seattle (2003)
- The Great Film Directors, Bank of American Gallery, Seattle (2000)
- San Francisco Airport Exhibition, San Francisco (1989)

== Awards ==
- Betty Bowen Memorial Award (Seattle Art Museum, 2002)
- Artist Trust fellowship (2005)
