= Fay Jones (artist) =

American painter

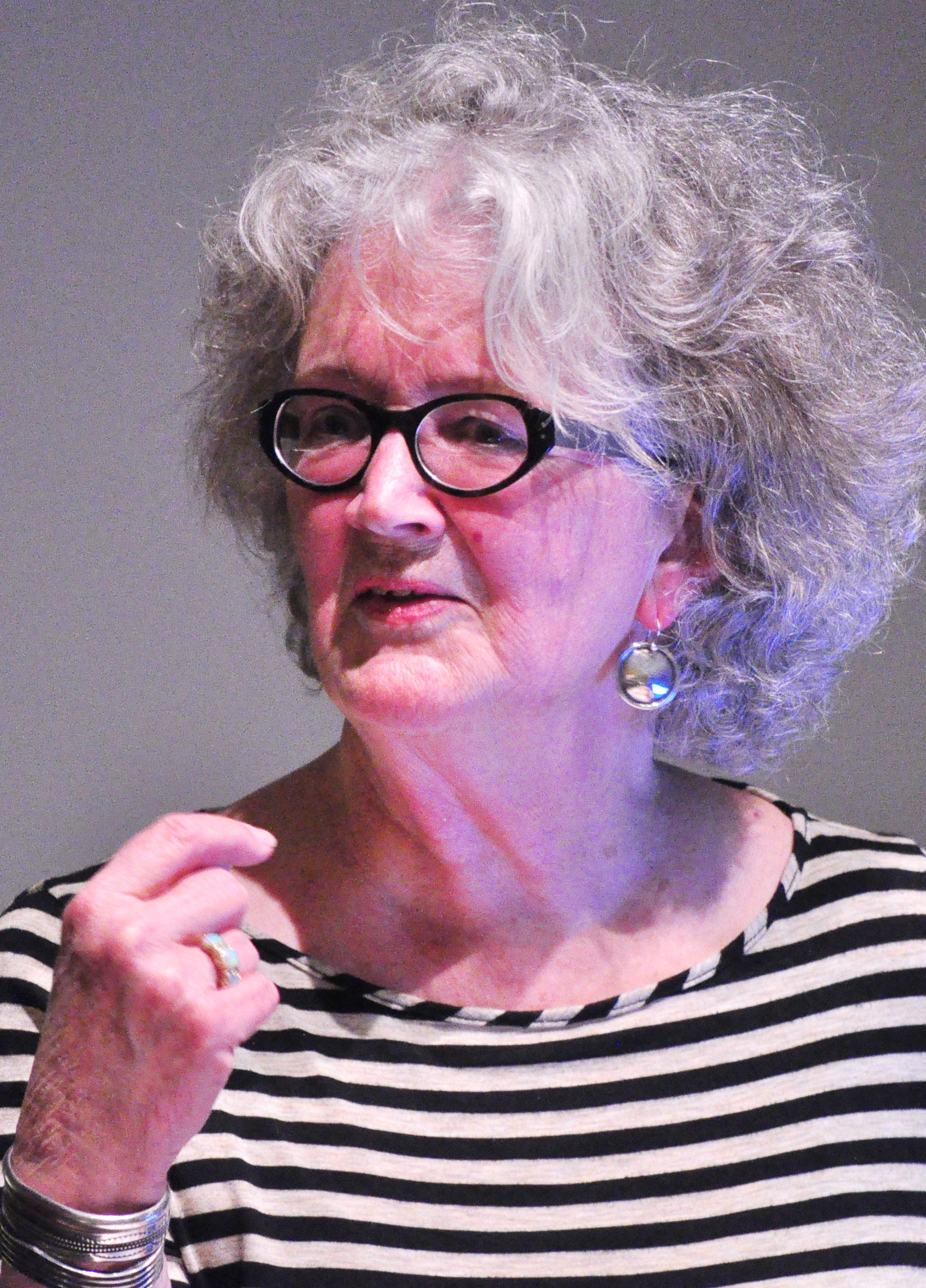
Fay Jones, 2013

Fay Jones (born 1936, birth name Fay Bailey) is an American artist, based in Seattle, Washington. A large number of her works are exhibited in public places in the Pacific Northwest, including a mural in the Westlake Station of the Downtown Seattle Transit Tunnel and a painting in Seattle's opera house, McCaw Hall. A 1986 retrospective organized by the Boise Art Museum also showed at the Seattle Art Museum.

== Early life ==
In 1953, she graduated from high school and enrolled in the Rhode Island School of Design (RISD). In 1956, she met RISD drawing instructor Robert C. Jones (b. 1930); they married the following year, and moved to Seattle in 1960, where Robert Jones became a member of the art faculty of the University of Washington. They had four children, born between 1958 and 1966.

Her father was the poet Robeson Bailey, and her great-grandfather was the abolitionist Gamaliel Bailey.

== Career ==
She had her first exhibit in 1970 at the Francine Seders Gallery in Seattle. In the mid-1980s, she was selected, along with Roger Shimomura and Gene Gentry McMahon to design major murals for the Westlake Station of the new Downtown Seattle Transit Tunnel. A 1996 retrospective organized by the Boise Art Museum also showed at the Seattle Art Museum and at the Washington State University Museum of Art in Pullman, Washington.

She illustrated one card (Stasis) for the debut set of the soon-to-be-famous Magic: The Gathering trading card game as a favor for her nephew, the game's designer Richard Garfield.

In 2006, Jones and her husband had a joint show at the Casa Museo Gene Byron in Guanajuato. They maintain a primary residence in West Seattle.

Her work is included in the permanent collection of the Seattle Art Museum.

== Awards ==
- 2013 - Joan Mitchell Painters and Sculptors grant
- 2006 - Seattle Art Museum’s Poncho Artist of the Year award
- 1983 and 1990 - grants from the NEA
- 1984 - Washington State Arts Commission
- 1989 - La Napoli Art Foundation
