= Natalie (given name) =

- Gender: Female

Origin
- Language: Latin

Other names
- Alternative spelling: Nathalie, Natallie, Nathali
- Variant form: Natalia
- Short forms: Natha, Nata, Nat
- Nicknames: Nat, Nattie, Talie, Tally

Natalie is a feminine given name derived from the Latin phrase natale domini, meaning "birth of the Lord". Further alternative spellings of the name include Nathalie, Natalee, and Natalia/Natalija.

== Notable people named Natalie ==
- Natalie of Serbia (1859–1941), Queen of Serbia
- Natalie A. Shepard, American politician
- Natalie Abrahami, British theater-, film-, and opera director
- Natalie Achonwa (born 1992), Canadian WNBA player
- Natalie Adams (born 1965), Australian judge
- Natalie Ahn, American biochemist, professor, and academic
- Natalie Albino (born 1984), American member of R&B duo Nina Sky
- Natalie Aleta Jackson, American trial attorney
- Natalie Alexander (born 1991), Australian wheelchair basketball player
- Natalie Allen (born 1962), American broadcast journalist
- Natalie Alt (1890–1959), American actress and singer
- Natalie Alvarado (commonly referred to as "Natalie") (born 1979), American R&B singer and songwriter
- Natalie Alyn Lind (born 1999), American actress
- Natalie Amrossi, American financial services broker
- Natalie Anderson (born 1981), English actress model
- Natalie Anderson Scott (1906–1983), Russian Empire-born American writer
- Natalie and Nadiya Anderson (born 1986), American television personalities and twins
- Natalie Angier (born 1958), American non-fiction writer and science journalist
- Natalie Ann Jamieson (born 1988), English actress
- Natalie Anne Kyriacou (born 1988), Australian social activist, social entrepreneur, and environmentalist
- Natalie Anter (born 1980), Italian softball player
- Natalie Appleton (born 1973), English-Canadian singer-songwriter and former member of the groups All Saints and Appleton
- Natalie Arras Tepper (1888–1950), American painter
- Natalie Ascencios, American painter and illustrator
- Natalie Augsburg (born 1983), German handball player
- Natalie Avellino (born 1970), Australian netballer, and former assistant coach
- Natalie Babbitt (1932–2016), American writer and illustrator of children's books
- Natalie Babonyová (born 1983), Canadian ice hockey player
- Natalie Bailey, Australian screenwriter and director
- Natalie Bale (born 1986), West Australian rower
- Natalie Ball (born 1980), American artist
- Natalie Bancroft (born c. 1980), American News Corporation person
- Natalie Banerji, Swiss professor of chemistry
- Natalie Barr (born 1968), Australian journalist, news presenter, and television presenter
- Natalie Barratt (born 1975), British racing driver
- Natalie Bassingthwaighte (born 1975), Australian recording artist, actress, television personality, and former singer for pop group the Rogue Traders
- Natalie Batalha (born 1966), American Astronomy and Astrophysics professor
- Natalie Bates (born 1980), Australian road cyclist
- Natalie Bauer-Lechner (1858–1921), Austrian violist
- Natalie Bawden (born 1984), English table tennis player
- Natalie Becker, South African actress
- Natalie Beckman (born 2000), American soccer player
- Natalie Bennett (born 1966), Australian-British politician and journalist
- Natalie Bergman (born 1988/1989), American singer-songwriter
- Natalie Beridze, Georgian composer and songwriter
- Natalie Bevan (1909–2007), British artist and art collector
- Natalie Bible' (born 1983), American film director, screenwriter, editor, and film producer
- Natalie Bieser (born 1948), American artist
- Natalie Bisaillon, Canadian politician
- Natalie Blair (born 1984), Australian soap actress
- Natalie Blais, American politician
- Natalie Blake (born 1982), British powerlifter
- Natalie Bodanya (1908–2007), American operatic soprano
- Natalie Bookchin, American artist
- Natalie Braswell, American lawyer and public servant
- Natalie Brown (disambiguation), several people
- Natalie Buchbinder (born 1999), American ice hockey player
- Natalie Buck (born 1980), Australian ice dancer
- Natalie Burgener (born 1983), American weightlifter
- Natalie Burn (born 1984), American actress
- Natalie Burton (born 1989), Australian basketball player
- Natalie Cabello (born 1990), Puerto Rican handball player
- Natalie Caine (1909–2008), English musician
- Natalie Campbell, British social entrepreneur
- Natalie Campbell Rodriques, Jamaican politician and diplomat
- Natalie Canerday (born 1962), American actress
- Natalie Carter Barraga (1915–2014), American educator and researcher
- Natalie Casey (born 1980), English actress, presenter, narrator, and singer
- Natalie Cassidy (born 1983), English actress
- Natalie Cramme-Hill (born 1986), German politician
- Natalie Ceeney (born 1971), British civil servant and businessperson
- Natalie Chaidez, American television writer and producer
- Natalie Chaitan-Maharaj, Trinidad and Tobago politician
- Natalie Chami (born 1987), Lebanese-American electronic musician
- Natalie Charlesworth (born 1969/1970), Australian judge
- Natalie Choquette (born 1959), French Canadian soprano
- Natalie Chou (born 1997), American basketball player
- Natalie Chriselda Tanasa (born 1993), Indonesian wushu taolu athlete
- Natalie Christensen (born 1966), American photographer
- Natalie Chudowsky (born 2008), American college soccer player
- Natalie Chung (born 1962), Canadian news anchor and journalist
- Natalie Clein (born 1977), British classical cellist
- Natalie Clifford Barney (1876–1972), American writer and salon hostess
- Natalie Cohen (born 1989), birth name of Madame Mayhem, American singer-songwriter and recording artist
- Natalie Cole (1950–2015), American singer, voice actress, songwriter, and actress
- Natalie Coleman (born 1983), British chef
- Natalie Cook (born 1975), Australian professional beach volleyball player and Olympic gold medallist
- Natalie Cochran (born 1980), American former pharmacist and convicted murderer
- Natalie Corless (born 2003), Canadian luger
- Natalie Cornah (born 1968), British television journalist
- Natalie Couch, New Zealand artist
- Natalie Coughlin (born 1982), American competition swimmer and twelve-time Olympic medalist
- Natalie Crawford, American operations researcher and military strategist
- Natalie Cressman, American jazz trombonist and vocalist
- Natalie Curtis (1875–1921), American ethnomusicologist
- Natalie Dagwell (1886–1965), American entertainer
- Natalie Darwitz (born 1983), American ice hockey player
- Natalie Davies (born 1966), British gymnast
- Natalie Davis (disambiguation), several people
- Natalie Davison (disambiguation), several people
- Natalie Dean (born 1987), American biostatistician
- Natalie de Blois (1921–2013), American architect
- Natalie de Bogory (1887–1939), Swiss-born American translator
- Natalie Decker (born 1997), American professional stock car racing driver
- Natálie Dejmková (born 1996), Czech ski jumper
- Natalie Delamere (born 1996), New Zealand rugby union player
- Natalie de la Rosa (born 2010), American rhythmic gymnast
- Natalie Dell (born 1985), American crew rower
- Natalie Denise Sperl, American model and film- and television actress
- Natalie Denise Suleman (born 1975), American mother of octuplets (also known as Nadya Suleman)
- Natalie Depraz (born 1964), French philosopher
- Natalie Dessay (born 1965), French singer, actress, and former operatic soprano
- Natalie Desselle-Reid (1967–2020), American actress
- Natalie Dew, English actress
- Natalie Dianová (born 1989), Czech modern pentathlete
- Natalie Diaz (born 1978), American poet, language activist, former professional basketball player, and educator
- Natalie Di Luccio (born 1989), Italian-Canadian classical-crossover singer
- Natalie Dodd (born 1992), New Zealand cricketer
- Natalie Don (born 1989; fl. 2020s), Scottish politician
- Natalie Dormer (born 1982), English actress
- Natalie Dower (1931–2023), English artist
- Natalie Draper (born 1985), American composer
- Natalie Dreyfuss (born 1987), American actress
- Natalie Duddington (1886–1972), Russian philosopher and literature translator
- Natalie Dumas (born 2008), American hurdler and sprinter
- Natalie Duncan (born 1988), British soul musician
- Natalie Dunn (born 1956), American roller skater
- Natalie Duran (born 1991), American professional rock climber, fitness model, medical researcher, and YouTube personality
- Natalie du Toit (born 1984), South African swimmer and Paralympic medallist
- Natalie Dybisz, British photographer
- Natalie Edgar (born 1932), American painter, former art critic, and art historian
- Natalie Edwards (born 1978), American treasury official and whistleblower
- Natalie Eggermont (born 1988), Belgian politician
- Natalie Elphicke (born 1970), British politician
- Natalie Enright Jerger, American computer scientist
- Natalie Erika James (born 1990), Australian-American filmmaker
- Natalie Eva Marie Nelson, birth name of Eva Marie (born 1984), American actress, fashion designer, model, and professional wrestler
- Natalie Evans, Baroness Evans of Bowes Park (born 1975), British politician
- Natalie Figueroa, American politician
- Natalie Finnemore (born 1988), British visual artist and sculptor
- Natalie Fleet (born 1984), British politician
- Natalie Forrest (born 1973), Australian television presenter
- Natalie Fort (born 1995), Ghanaian news anchor and television personality
- Natalie Fox, British romantic fiction writer
- Natalie Frank (born 1980), American artist
- Natalie Franklin (disambiguation), several people
- Natalie Fryde (born 1945), British medievalist, historian, and writer
- Natalie Fulton (born 1977), South African field hockey international
- Natalie Galea (born 1973), Australian judoka
- Natalie Garcia (footballer) (born 1990), American-born Mexican footballer
- Natalie Garcia (gymnast) (born 2003), Canadian rhythmic gymnast
- Natalie Garonzi, Australian actress, writer, comedian, and TV presenter
- Natalie Gauci (born 1981), Australian musician, producer, and teacher
- Natalie Gauld, New Zealand pharmacist
- Natalie Gaupp (born 1967), American playwright
- Natalie Gavin (born 1988), English actress
- Natalie Geisenberger (born 1988), German luger
- Natalie Gelman (born 1985), American folk-pop singer and songwriter
- Natalie Germanos (born 1981), South African cricket commentator, freelance journalist and radio personality
- Natalie Gioia, Ukrainian electronic music vocalist and songwriter
- Natalie Glebova (born 1981), Russian-Canadian television host, author, dancer, model, and Miss Universe 2005
- Natalie Gnehm (born 1991), Thai model
- Natalie Gold, American actress
- Natalie Golda (born 1981), American former water polo player and current coach
- Natalie Goldberg (born 1948), American popular author and speaker
- Natalie Grainger (born 1977), English-born South African/American professional squash player
- Natalie Grams (born 1978), German physician and author
- Natalie Grandin (born 1981), South African tennis player
- Natalie Grant (born 1971), American contemporary Christian music singer-songwriter
- Natalie Gregory (born 1975), American former child actress
- Natalie Grenier (born 1964), Canadian speed skater
- Natalie Griesbeck (born 1956), French politician
- Natalie Grinczer (born 1993), British professional racing cyclist
- Natalie Grinham (born 1978), Australian squash player
- Natalie Gruzlewski (born 1977), Australian television presenter
- Natalie Gulbis (born 1983), American professional golfer
- Natalie Gumede (born 1984), English actress
- Natalie Haas, American cellist
- Natalie Hagglund (born 1992), American volleyball player
- Natalie Haigh (born 1989), English professional footballer
- Natalie Hall (born 1990), Canadian actress and singer
- Natalie Hallam (born 1972), British actress
- Natalie Hammond (disambiguation), several people
- Natalie Harder, American academic administrator
- Natalie Harp (born 1991), American television personality and Donald Trump aide
- Natalie Harrowell (1990–2019), English rugby league player
- Natalie Harvey (born 1975), Australian long-distance runner
- Natalie Haynes (born 1974), English writer, broadcaster, classicist, and comedian
- Natalie Hemby (born 1977), American country music singer and songwriter
- Natalie Hennedige (born 1974), Singaporean dramatist, playwright, and theater director
- Natalie Henry (born 1981), Australian country singer-songwriter
- Natalie Hermann (born 1999), German group rhythmic gymnast
- Natalie Hershberger (born 2004), American taekwondo athlete
- Natalie Herzen (1844–1931), Russian writer
- Natalie Higgins (born 1988), American politician
- Natalie Hinds (born 1993), American professional swimmer
- Natalie Hinderas (1927–1987), American pianist, composer, and professor
- Natalie Ho (born 2003), Hong Kong member of girl group Strayz
- Natalie Hodgskin (born 1976), Australian softball player
- Natalie Holland (born 1962), Russian-born contemporary artist, working in England
- Natalie Holt (born 1982), British composer
- Natalie Hoover (born 1989), American voice actress
- Natalie Hope Reisberg, birth name of Teri Hope (1938–2023), American model and actress
- Natalie Horler (born 1981), German-English television presenter, and lead singer of Cascada
- Natalie Hsu (born 2004), Hong Kong actress
- Natalie Hudson (born 1957), American judge
- Natalie Hughes, New Zealand pharmaceutical scientist
- Natalie Hunter (disambiguation), several people
- Natalie Hurst (born 1983), Australian WNBL player
- Natalie Hutchins (born 1972), Australian politician
- Natalie Imbruglia (born 1975), Australian pop singer, songwriter, soap actress, and model
- Natalie Irish (born 1982), American visual artist
- Natalie J. Robb (born 1974), Scottish actress and singer
- Natalie Jacobs (born 1997), American professional soccer player
- Natalie Jacobson (born 1943), American news anchor
- Natalie Jameson, Canadian politician
- Natalie Jane, American singer-songwriter
- Natalie Jane Prior (born 1963), Australian writer
- Natalie Jaresko (born 1965), American-born former politician and Ukrainian investment banker
- Natalie Jenkinson (born 1976), Australian judoka
- Natalie Jeremijenko (born 1966), Australian artist and engineer
- Natalie Jones (swimmer) (born 1984), British Paralympic swimmer
- Natalie Jones (diplomat), American diplomat
- Natalie Joyce (1902–1992), American actress
- Natalie Joy Johnson (born 1978), American actress
- Natalie Juncos (born 1990), American-born Argentine footballer
- Natalie Kaaiawahia, American track and field athlete
- Natalie Kalibat (born 1993), American sportscaster, journalist, television personality, and former diver
- Natalie Kalmus (1882–1965), American Technicolor color specialist
- Natalie Kampen (1944–2012), American art historian and women's studies professor
- Natalie Kanyapak Phoksomboon (born 1991), Thai-Swiss model and beauty pageant titleholder
- Natalie Kassanga (born 1997), British musical theatre actress
- Natalie Kertes Weaver (born 1974), American author and theologian
- Natalie Kerwin (born 1991), New Zealand professional racing cyclist
- Natalie Khor (born 1984), Hong Kong beauty pageant winner
- Natalie King (born 1966), Australian curator and writer
- Natalie Kingston (1905–1991), American actress
- Natalie Knepp (fl. 2010s–2020s), American actress
- Natalie Knight (born 1986), American sprinter
- Natálie Kocábová (born 1984), Czech poet, writer, and musician
- Natalie Kononenko, Canadian professor of folklore
- Natalie Korneitsik, Estonian beauty queen, presenter, and model
- Natalie Krill (born 1983), Canadian actress and former dancer
- Natalie Kusz (born 1962), American memoirist
- Natalie Kwadrans (born 1973), French-Canadian athlete
- Natalie Lamoureux, Canadian film editor
- Natalie Lankester (born 1989), Emirati equestrian
- Natalie La Rose (born 1988), Dutch singer, songwriter, and dancer
- Natalie LaRue (born 1983), American singer and songwriter
- Weyes Blood (born 1988), stage name of Natalie Laura Mering, American singer, songwriter, and musician
- Natalie Layne, American Christian musical artist
- Natalie Lennox (born 1964), American actress and model
- Natalie Lewis (born 1982), Welsh middle-distance athlete
- Natalie Lima, Cuban-Puerto Rican author
- Natalie Lisinska (born 1982), British-Canadian actress
- Natalie Lloyd, American children's author
- Natalie Lobela (born 1973), Congolese basketball player
- Natalie Long (born 1990), Irish rower
- Natalie Lowe (born 1980), Australian ballroom dancer
- Natalie Maag (born 1997), Swiss luger
- Natalie MacLean, Canadian wine critic and non-fiction writer
- Natalie MacMaster (born 1972), Canadian fiddler
- Natalie Madueño (born 1987), Danish actress
- Natalie Mahowald (born 1963), American earth scientist and college professor
- Natalie Maines (born 1974), American lead singer for the Dixie Chicks
- Natalie Mai Vitetti (1910–1987), American museum trustee
- Natalie Manley (born 1961), American politician
- Natalie Marcin (1914–1999), American short story writer and editor
- Natalie Marr, Australian politician
- Natalie Martindale (born 1977), Saint Vincent and the Grenadines sprinter
- Natalie Martinez (born 1984), American actress and model
- Natalie Massenet (born 1965), British-American fashion entrepreneur and former journalist
- Natalie Massenet (born 1965), American businesswoman
- Natalie Massey (born 1989), British Paralympic swimmer
- Natalie Masters (1915–1986), American actress
- Natalie Mastracci (born 1989), Canadian rower
- Natalie Matosin, Australian scientist
- Natalie McCool, English singer-songwriter and musician
- Natalie McCurry (1966–2014), Australian actress
- Natalie McGarry (born 1981), Scottish politician
- Natalie McGiffert (born 1997), American group rhythmic gymnast
- Natalie McNeal (born 2003), American basketball player
- Natalie McQueen (born 1989), English actress
- Natalie Medhurst (born 1984), Australian international netball player
- Natalie Medlock (born 1986), British-born New Zealand actress, writer, and producer
- Natalie Mei (1900–1975), Estonian painter and graphic artist
- Natalie Meisner, Canadian playwright and poet
- Natalie Mejia (born 1988), American past member of girl group Girlicious
- Natalie Melmore (born 1989), English lawn bowler
- Natalie Mendoza (born 1976), Australian actress, singer, and dancer
- Natalie Merchant (born 1963), American musician, and former lead singer for 10,000 Maniacs
- Natalie Metcalf (born 1992), English netball player
- Natalie Meyer (1930–2021), American politician
- Natalie Mihalek, American politician
- Natalie Miller, Australian film distributor, exhibitor, and producer
- Natálie Mlýnková (born 2001), Czech ice hockey player
- Natalie Montgomery-Carroll (born 1974), American fitness competitor, fitness trainer, professional model, and reality TV contestant
- Natalie Moorhead (1901–1992), American film- and stage actress
- Natalie Morales (disambiguation), several people
- Natalie Moszkowska (1886–1968), Polish socialist economist
- Natalie Munro, American anthropologist
- Natalie Munt (born 1977), English Olympic badminton player
- Natalie Murdock (born 1984), American politician
- Natalie Muth (born 1998), American soccer player
- Natalie Mwagale (born 1993), Kenyan basketball player
- Natalie Myburgh (1940–2014), South African swimmer
- Natalie Nakase (born 1980), American professional basketball coach
- Nethalie Nanayakkara (born 1936), Sri Lankan Sinhala cinema-, television-, and theater actress
- Natalie Nassar (born 1981), American voice actress
- Natalie Neaton (born 1974), American soccer player
- Natalie Nedd, Guyanese footballer
- Natalie "Nattie" Neidhart (born 1982), Canadian-American professional WWE wrestler
- Natalie Neita, Jamaican politician
- Natalie Nessler (born 1976), German curler
- Natalie Netzler, New Zealand Maori-Samoan virologist
- Natalie Nevins (1925–2010), American singer
- Natalie Nicholson (born 1976), American curler
- Natalie Ni Shi (born 1983), Canadian lyric operatic soprano and film actress
- Natalie Norwick (1923–2007), American actress
- Natalie Nougayrède (born 1966), French journalist
- Natalie Novosel (born 1989), American professional basketball player
- Natalie Nunn (born 1984), American reality TV personality
- Natalie Obkircher (born 1971), Italian luger
- Natalie Oca (born 2006), Filipino footballer
- Natalie O'Connor (born 1982), British international athlete
- Natalie Ogg, American fashion model
- Natalie Ogle (born 1960), English actress
- Natalie Okri (born 1998), British singer and songwriter
- Natalie Ong (born 2000), Singaporean-Australian singer-songwriter
- Natalie Orellana (born 2001), American-born Nicaraguan footballer
- Natalie Pack (born 1989), American fashion model and real estate agent
- Natalie Palamides (born 1990), American actress
- Natalie Panagarry (born 1990), English netball player
- Natalie Panek (born 1983), Canadian aerospace engineer
- Natalie Papazoglu (born 1983), Gagauz-Ukrainian singer-songwriter
- Natalie Paris (born 1994), British stage actress, singer and dancer
- Natalie C. Parker, children's literature author
- Natalie Paul (born 1986), American actress
- Natalie Pawelski, American journalist and television correspondent
- Natalie Pawlik (born 1992), German politician
- Natalie Payida Jabangwe (born c. 1983), Zimbabwean computer engineer and businesswoman
- Natalie Pfau-Weller (born 1987), German politician
- Natalie Phelps Finnie, American politician
- Natalie Pierre, Canadian politician
- Natalie Pike (born 1983), English model and presenter for Manchester City FC
- Natalie Pinkham (born 1977), British television presenter
- Natalie Plane (born 1996), Australian AFL player
- Natalie Pluskota (born 1989), American tennis player
- Natalie Porat-Shliom, Israeli-American cell biologist and microscopist
- Natalie Porter (born 1980), Australian basketball player
- Natalie Portman (born 1981), American-Israeli actress and filmmaker
- Natalie Potts (born 2004), American basketball player
- Natalie Powell (born 1990), Welsh judoka
- Natalie Powers (born 1977), English singer
- Natalie Prass (born 1986), American singer-songwriter
- Natalie Press (born 1980), English actress
- Natalie Preston (born 1977), English footballer
- Natalie Price (disambiguation), several people
- Natalie Prystajecky, Canadian biologist
- Natalie Psaila, Maltese doctor and abortion-rights activist
- Natalie Qasabian, American film producer
- Natalie Quillian, American political strategist
- Natalie Radford (born 1966), Canadian actress
- Natalie Raitano (born 1966), American actress and current fitness professional, fitness expert, and strength training coach
- Natalie Raits (born 2002), Israeli group rhythmic gymnast
- Natalie Ramsey (born 1975), American television actress
- Natalie Randolph, American hurdler and football player
- Natalie Rasmussen (born 1977), Australian driver and trainer of racehorses in Australia and New Zealand
- Natalie Ravitz, American NFL senior vice president of communications
- Natalie Redmond (born 1991), Australian road- and cyclo-cross cyclist
- Macy Gray (born 1967), stage name of Natalie Renée McIntyre, American singer and actress
- Natalie Rial, American voice actress
- Natalie Richard, Canadian television personality and former VJ
- Natalie Rickli (born 1976), Swiss politician
- Natalie Riess, American artist, illustrator, and webcomic creator
- Natalie Robinson, New Zealand Antarctic researcher
- Natalie Robinson Cole (1901–1984), American educator
- Natalie Roe, American physicist and cosmologist
- Natalie Rogers (1928–2015), American humanistic psychologist
- Natalie Roles (born 1973), English actress
- Natalie Rooney (born 1988), New Zealand sport shooter
- Natalie de la Rosa (born 2010), American rhythmic gymnast
- Natalie Roser (born 1990), Australian fashion model
- Natalie Ross (born 1989), Scottish footballer
- Natalie Rothstein (1930–2010), British curator and academic
- Natalie Rupnow (2009–2024), perpetrator in the 2024 Abundant Life Christian School shooting in Madison, Wisconsin, United States
- Natalie Rushdie (born 1986), British jazz singer
- Natalie Rusk (born 1965), American research scientist
- Natalie Ryan, American disc golfer
- Natalie Sabanadze, Georgian professor, ambassador, and politician
- Natalie Sago (born 1989), American NBA referee
- Natalie Saleeba (born 1978), Australian-Lebanese actress
- Natalie Sandtorv (born 1988), Norwegian jazz musician
- Natalie Sather (born 1985), American auto racing driver
- Natalie Savage Carlson (1906–1997), American writer of children's books
- Natalie Saville (born 1978), Australian race walker
- Natalie Sawyer (born 1979), English television-, podcast-, and Talksport radio presenter
- Natalie Scala, American industrial engineer
- Natalie Schafer (1900–1991), American actress known for Gilligan's Island
- Natalie Schilling, American linguistics professor
- Natalie Schneider (born 1983), American wheelchair basketball player
- Natalie Seiler (born 1968), Swiss gymnast
- Natalie Seybold (born 1965), American pair skater
- Natalie Seymour (born 1986), British triathlete and former field hockey player
- Natalie Shaw (born 1980), American actress
- Natalie Shirley (born 1957), American lawyer, businesswoman, and university president
- Natalie Shiyanova (born 1979), Russian actress
- Natalie Sideserf (born 1985), American artist, teacher, and chef
- Natalie Simanowski (born 1978), German Paralympic cyclist
- Natalie Simon, American soccer referee
- Natalie Sims (born 1984), American musician, songwriter, graphic designer, visual artist, writer, and music executive
- Natalie Sims (swimmer) (born 1997), American Paralympic swimmer
- Natalie Sleeth (1930–1992), American pianist and choral composer
- Natalie Smith (disambiguation), several people
- Natalie Snodgrass (born 1998), American ice hockey player
- Natalie So (born 1996), Hong Kong member of Cantopop girl group Collar
- Natalie Sorokin (1921–1967), French writer and radio worker
- Natalie Sourisseau (born 1992), Canadian field hockey player
- Natalie Spilger (born 1982), American soccer player
- Natalie Spooner (born 1990), Canadian ice hockey player
- Natalie Stafford (born 1976), British basketball player
- Natalie Stelmach (1957/1958–2011), Canadian snooker player
- Natalie Steward (born 1943), British Olympic swimmer
- The Floacist (born 1979), stage name of Natalie Stewart, English rapper, singer, songwriter, spoken word artist, poet, and actress
- Natalie Stingelin (born 1973), American material scientist and engineer
- Natalie Stovall, American past member of Natalie Stovall and the Drive, country music group
- Natalie Strynadka (born 1963), Canadian biochemistry professor and scientist
- Natalie Sue, Canadian writer
- Natalie Suleyman (born 1974), Australian politician
- Natalie Sumner Lincoln (1881–1935), American novelist
- Natalie Talmadge (1896–1969), American silent film actress
- Natálie Taschlerová (born 2001), Czech ice dancer
- Natalie Taylor (disambiguation), several people
- Natalie Telewiak (born 1981), Canadian architect
- Natalie Tennant (born 1967), American politician
- Natalie Thurlow, New Zealand curler
- Natalie Titcume (born 1975), Australian softball player
- Natalie Tobin (born 1996), Australian soccer player
- Natalie Tong (born 1981), Hong Kong actress and model
- Natalie Toro (disambiguation), several people
- Natalie Townsend (1866–1962), American composer
- Natalie Tran (born 1986), Australian online producer, actress, and comedian
- Natalie Trundy (1940–2019), American stage-, film-, and television actress
- Natalie Tschan (born 1971), Swiss tennis player
- Natalie Turner, Canadian animator, effects animator, and animation professor
- Natalie Tychmini, Russian female cross-dresser who fought in World War I
- Natalie Van Coevorden (born 1992), Australian triathlete
- Natalie van den Adel (born 1990), Dutch professional basketball player
- Natalie van Gogh (born 1974), Dutch professional racing cyclist
- Natalie Van Vleck (1901–1981), American female artist, farmer and conservationist
- Natalie Venetia Belcon (born 1969), Trinidadian-born American actress and singer
- Natalie Vértiz (born 1991), Peruvian TV host, model, and beauty pageant titleholder
- Natalie Victurnienne, Marchioness of Rougé (1759–1828), French marchioness
- Natalie Villalobos, American advocate for diversity and inclusion
- Natalie Vinti (born 1988), American-born Mexican international footballer
- Natalie von Bertouch (born 1982), Australian netball international
- Natalie von Milde (1850–1906), German writer and feminist
- Natalie Walker, American singer and musician, and former member of Daughter Darling
- Natalie Walker (academic), New Zealand professor of public health
- Natalie Walter (born 1979), British actress and writer
- Natalie Ward (softball player) (born 1975), Australian Olympic softball player
- Natalie Ward (politician), Australian politician from New South Wales
- Natalie Warner (born 1989), American singer, songwriter, and producer
- Natalie Washington, English footballer and LGBT activist
- Natalie Weir (born 1967), Australian choreographer and artistic director
- Natalie Wells, American politician
- Natalie West (born 1956), American television-, film-, and stage actress
- Natalie Westbrook, American multimedia artist
- Natalie Wexler (born 1955), American writer, literacy advocate, and legal historian
- Natalie Wheen (born 1947), English writer and radio presenter
- Natalie Whitby, Australian jurist
- Natalie White, American artist
- Natalie Whitford Uhl (1919–2017), American botanist
- Natalie Wicken (1930–2022), New Zealand netball player
- Natalie Wideman (born 1992), Canadian softball player
- Natalie Wiegersma (born 1990), New Zealand swimmer
- Natalie K. Wight (born 1974/1975), American lawyer
- Natalie Wilkie (born 2001), Canadian Paralympic cross-country skier
- Natalie Williams (born 1970), American basketball executive and former WNBA player
- Natalie Wilson (born 1971), American gospel singer and songwriter
- Natalie Winters (born 1970), American basketball and volleyball player
- Natalie Wojcik (born 1999), American artistic gymnast
- Natalie Wolchover (born 1986), American science writer and LGBT journalist
- Natalie Wong (born 1976), Hong Kong actress
- Natalie Wood (disambiguation), several people
- Natalie Wynn (born 1988), American YouTuber, political commentator, and cultural critic
- Natalie Yoffe (born 1985), Uruguayan model and television personality
- Natalie Zahle (1827–1913), Danish reform pedagogue and women's education pioneer
- Natalie Zea (born 1975), American actress
- Natalie Zeleznikar (born 1966), American politician
- Natalie Ziegler (born 1955), American politician and farmer

== Notable people named Nathaly ==
- Nathaly Antona (1975–2024), French politician
- Nathaly Farinango, Ecuadorian politician
- Nathaly Grimán (born 1991), Venezuelan freestyle wrestler
- Nathaly Kurata (born 1993), Brazilian inactive tennis player
- Nathaly López Borja (1987–2023), Ecuadorian engineer
- Nathaly Navas (born 1987), Venezuelan model and pageant titleholder
- Nathaly Silva (born 2001), American-born Nicaraguan footballer

== Fictional characters ==
- Natalie, a main character from flash games Epic Battle Fantasy
- Natalie, a character from the 2025 film A Minecraft Movie
- Natalie Barnes, from the soap opera Coronation Street, played by Denise Welch
- Natalie "Sugar" Berzatto, from the comedy drama series The Bear, played by Abby Elliott
- Natalie Blackstone, also known as Nagisa Misumi, protagonist of the anime series Futari wa Pretty Cure and Futari wa Pretty Cure Max Heart
- Natalie Buchanan, from the soap opera One Life to Live, played by Melissa Archer
- Natalie Fabelman, from the 2022 Steven Spielberg film The Fabelmans
- Natalie Figueroa, from the comedy drama series Orange Is the New Black, played by Alysia Reiner
- Natalie Green, from the sitcom "The Facts of Life", played by Mindy Cohn
- Natalie Jastrow, from the novels The Winds of War and War and Remembrance, by Herman Wouk
- Natalie Kabra, from The 39 Clues
- Natalie Miller, also known as Aguri Madoka, from the anime series DokiDoki! PreCure
- Natalie Nash, from the soap opera Home and Away, played by Antoinette Byron
- Natalie Osborne, from the soap opera Hollyoaks, played by Tiffany Mulheron
- Natalie Scatorccio, from the thriller drama series Yellowjackets, played by Juliette Lewis and Sophie Thatcher
- Natalie V. "Envy" Adams, from the Scott Pilgrim graphic novels

== See also ==
- Natali (name)
- Natalee
- Nathalie
- Natalya
- Natalia (given name)
- Natasha
- Natacha (given name)
- Natasja
- Natty (disambiguation)
