= Nataly =

Nataly is a female given name, a variant form of Natalie (given name).

== People with the given name Nataly ==
- Nataly Andria, Nataly Laingo Haritiana Andrianaivoson, Malagasy singer-songwriter
- Nataly Dawn, performing name of Natalie Dawn Knutsen, American vocalist with Pomplamoose
- Nataly Patiño, Colombian accordionist
- Hamy Nataly Tejeda Funes (born 1984), Guatemalan beauty queen

== Fictional characters ==
- Nataly, a character in the video game Suikoden IV
- Nataly Jäger, wife of Jo Gerner in the long-running German soap opera Gute Zeiten, schlechte Zeiten

== See also ==
- Natalee
- Natalia (given name)
- Natalie (given name)
- Nathalie
- Natasha
- Natty (disambiguation)
- La fiera, 1983 Mexican telenovela also known as Nataly
