= Natalie =

Natalie may refer to:

== Places ==
- Natalie, Michigan, an unincorporated community

== People ==
- Natalie (given name)
- Natalie (singer) (born 1979), Mexican-American R&B singer/songwriter
- Beby Natalie (born 1999), better known as Natalie Zenn, Indonesian actress and singer
- Shahan Natalie (1884–1983), Armenian writer and principal organizer of Operation Nemesis
- Natalie Sarah (born 1983), Indonesian actress

== Music ==
=== Albums ===
- Natalie (Natalie album), by Natalie Alvarado, 2005
- Natalie (Natalie Cole album), 1976

=== Songs ===
- "Natalie" (Ola song), 2006
- "Natalie", by Ada LeAnn, representing Michigan in the American Song Contest, 2022
- "Natalie", by Bruno Mars from Unorthodox Jukebox, 2012
- "Natalie", by Dave Rowland, 1982
- "Natalie", by Freddy Cannon, 1966
- "Natalie", by Rich Dodson, 1980
- "Natalie", by Shirley Bassey from I Am What I Am, 1984
- "Natalie", by Stephen Duffy, 1993

== Other uses ==
- Natalie (film), a 2010 South Korean film
- Natalie (website), a Japanese entertainment news website

== See also ==
- Natalee, a given name
- Natali (disambiguation)
- Nathalie (disambiguation)
