= Tatyana Koshkaryova =

Tatyana Petrovna Koshkaryova (Russian: Татьяна Петровна Кошкарёва; born 5 September 1962) is a Russian journalist. A correspondent for the Gudok, Moskovskiye Novosti and Today newspapers, she was Deputy General Director of ORT from 1999 to 2000 and editor-in-chief of the Nezavisimaya Gazeta newspaper between 2001 and 2007.

== Early life and education ==
Koshkaryova was born in Moscow on 5 September 1962. Her mother was a doctor and her father was a military pilot. Koshkaryova is a graduate of the MSU Faculty of Journalism of the Moscow State University, obtaining a degree in journalism in 1986.

== Career ==
She worked in the Moscow City Committee of the Communist Party of the Soviet Union and later became a correspondent for the Gudok and Moskovskiye Novosti newspapers, working at the latter from 1992 to 1993. Koshkaryova worked as a correspondent in the economics department at the Today newspaper between 1993 and 1995. She was promoted to columnist and then editor of the newspaper's economics department. In 1997, Koshkaryova was appointed editor of the politics department at the Nezavisimaya Gazeta newspaper and was promoted to deputy editor-in-chief in August 1998.

She was the presenter of the Russia-1 programme SKV. In April 1999, Sergey Dorenko resigned from his position of Head of the Information Programming Directorate at the urging of Channel One director Igor Shabdurasulov and Koshkaryova was chosen as his successor following a recommendation by businessman Boris Berezovsky. She resigned from Nezavisimaya Gazeta in March 1999, and began working in the position in June 1999, which she held until September 2000. Koshkaryova also worked as Deputy General Director of ORT from 24 January 2000 to September 2000. In June 2001, she was appointed editor-in-chief of Nezavisimaya Gazeta by the newspaper's shareholders. Koshkaryova said she was influenced to take up the position because she was acquainted with the staff and the editorial board's internal structure. She resigned from the position in February 2007, after Konstantin Remchukov, the newspaper's owner, became its editor-in-chief and general director.

== Personal life and award ==
Koshkaryova has one child. She is a 1998 recipient of the Golden Pen of Russia from the Russian Union of Journalists.
