= Nezavisimoye Voyennoye Obozreniye =

Russian weekly Newspaper

- Type: Weekly
- Format: A3 per spread
- Owner: Konstantin Remchukov
- Editor: Konstantin Remchukov
- Founded: February 11, 1995
- Headquarters: Moscow, Russia
- Circulation: 12,000
- Website: http://nvo.ng.ru/

Nezavisimoye Voyennoye Obozreniye (NVO; Russian: Независимое военное обозрение, Independent Military Review) is a publication on military topics that is issued as a weekly supplement to the Russian newspaper Nezavisimaya Gazeta. It covers military posture, military science, the activity of secret services, military technology, weapons, and the military history of Russia and other countries. It was founded by the editor-in-chief of Nezavisimaya Gazeta, Vitaly Tretyakov. Currently, the CEO and the editor-in-chief is Konstantin Remchukov.

The first issue of NVO was published on February 11, 1995, the second in autumn of the same year. In 1996 it was published twice a month, since 1997 once a week.

The newspaper has often been relatively critical of Russian military policy and planning, especially in the light of the Russian military reform that was initiated in 2008.
