= Lahdenmäki =

Lahdenmäki is a Finnish surname that may refer to:

- Jarkko Lahdenmäki (born 1991), Finnish football player
- Nathalie Lahdenmäki (born 1975), Finnish ceramic artist and designer
