= Nathalie (disambiguation) =

Nathalie is a female given name.

Nathalie may also refer to:

- Nathalie (1957 film), a 1957 French-Italian film directed by Christian-Jaque
- Nathalie..., a 2003 French film starring Fanny Ardant
- "Nathalie" (song), a 1964 song by Gilbert Bécaud
- "Nathalie", a song by Julio Iglesias from his 1982 album Momentos

== See also ==
- Natalie (disambiguation)
