= Natali (surname) =

Natali is an Italian surname. People with the surname include:

- Ada Natali (1898–1990), first woman mayor in Italy
- Antonio Natali (politician) (1921–1991), Italian politician
- Antonio Natali (art historian) (born 1951), Italian art historian and academic
- Carlo Natali, also known as il Guardolino, (circa 1592-1683), Italian painter of the Baroque period
- Carlo Giacomo Natali (1730–1791), Italian priest and author
- Cesare Natali (born 1979), Italian footballer
- Dino Natali, American actor
- Elmo Natali (1927–2019), American football player and coach
- Elvira Natali (born 1996), Indonesian author, singer and actress
- Giovanni Battista Natali, Italian painter of the late-Baroque period
- Giovanni Battista Natali (bishop) (1628-1687), Italian Roman Catholic prelate who served as Bishop of Ston
- Jelal Kalyanji Natali (1899–1993), Indian-New Zealand shopkeeper, Indian community leader and anti-racism activist
- Lorenzo Natali (1922–1989), Italian politician
- Paul Natali (1933–2020), French politician and businessman
- Renato Natali (1883-1979), Italian painter
- Susan M. Natali (born 1969), American scientist
- Valiano Natali (1918–2000), Italian operatic tenor
- Vincenzo Natali (born 1969), American-Canadian film director and screenwriter

== See also ==
- Natali, disambiguation page
- Natali (name), list of people with the given name
