= Natty =

Natty may refer to:

== People with the given name ==
- Natty Dominique (1896-1982), American jazz trumpeter
- Natty Hollmann (1939-2021), Argentine philanthropist
- Natty King (born 1977), Jamaican Reggae artist
- Natty Zavitz, actor in Degrassi: The Next Generation

== People with the nickname ==
- Natty (British singer) (born 1983), American-British singer-songwriter
- Natty (Thai singer) (born 2002), Thai K-pop singer
- Natarajan "Natty" Subramaniam, Indian actor and cinematographer

== Fictional characters ==
- Natty Bumppo, protagonist of the Leatherstocking Tales novels
- Natty (Hollyoaks), in the British TV soap opera
- the protagonist of The Journey of Natty Gann, a 1985 Disney film
- Natalie "Natty" Hillard, in the 1993 film Mrs. Doubtfire

== Other uses ==
- slang for Natural bodybuilding, particularly in the bodybuilding community (where it refers to abstention from performance-enhancing drugs)
- Natural Light and related beers, also called Natty
- a nickname for the College Football Playoff National Championship, also commonly used for any NCAA sports championship

== See also ==
- Natalee
- Natalia (disambiguation)
- Natalie (given name)
- Natasha
- Nathalie
- Nattie Neidhart, a professional wrestler
- Naty
- Netty (disambiguation)
