= Natali =

Natali may refer to:

- Natali Vineyards
- Natali (name), list of people with the given name
- Natali (surname), list of people with the surname
- Little Natali
- Natali (singer)
