= Naty =

Naty is a given name. Notable people with the name include:

- Naty Alvarado, American former handball player
- Naty Bernardo (1911-1987), Filipino actress
- Naty Botero (born 1980), Colombian model and singer
- Naty Crame-Rogers (1922-2021), Filipina actress, drama teacher, writer, producer, and researcher
- Naty Rangel (born 1988), Mexican badminton player
- Naty Rozario, Hong Kong former international lawn bowler
- Naty Saidoff (born c. 1957), Israeli-born American diamond dealer, real estate investor, and philanthropist

== See also ==
- Natty (disambiguation)
