= Natalie Brown =

Natalie Brown may refer to:

- Natalie Brown (singer) (born 1978), Canadian-born R&B and pop singer-songwriter
- Natalie Brown (actress) (born 1973), Canadian actress known for her role in Sophie
- Natalie E. Brown, American diplomat
- Natalie Browne, England-based vocalist project name owned by Almighty Records
- Natalie Brown (cricketer) (born 1990), English cricketer
