= Vascular permeability =

Attribute of blood vessels

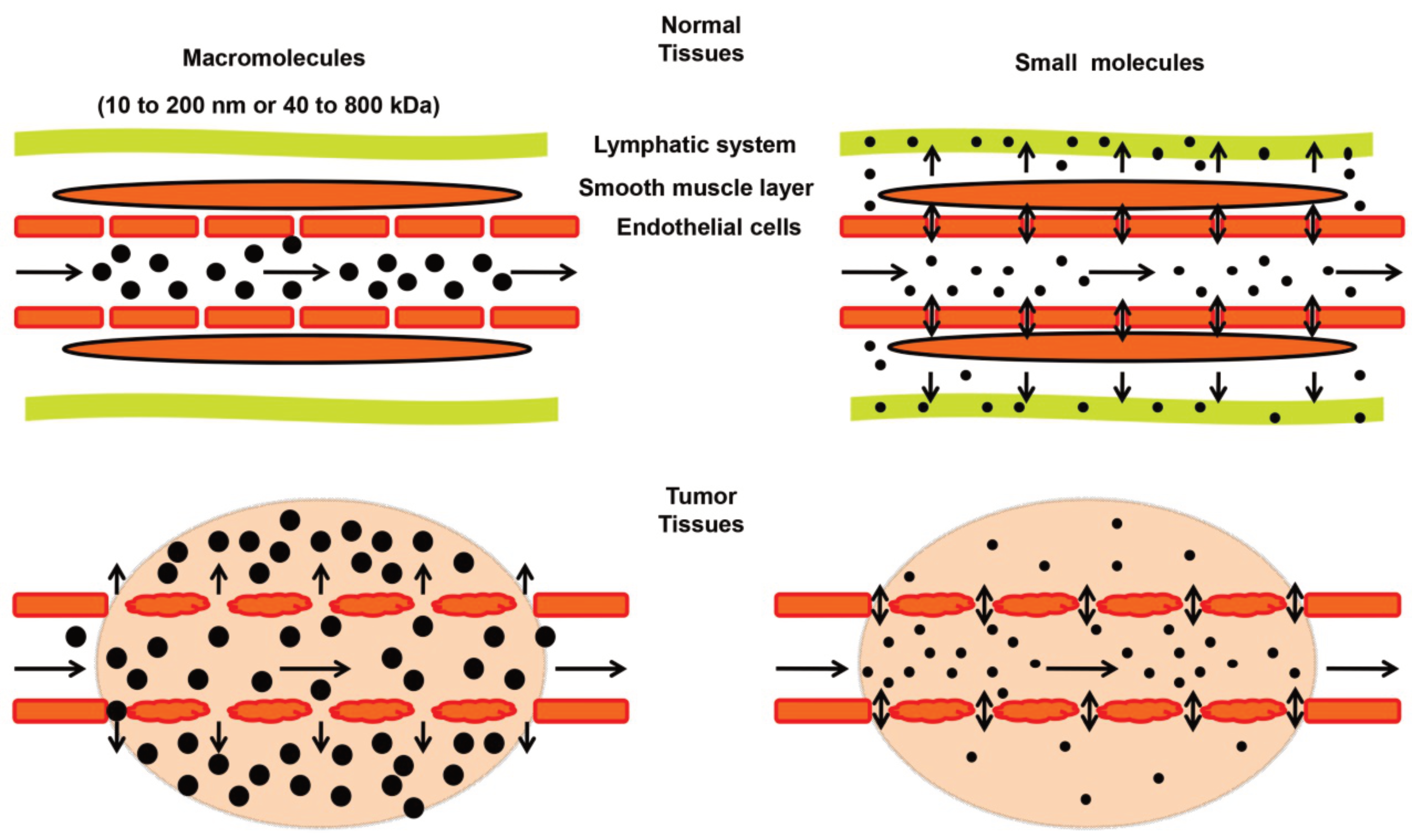
Differences in vascular permeability between normal tissue and a tumor

Vascular permeability, often in the form of capillary permeability or microvascular permeability, characterizes the permeability of a blood vessel wall–in other words, the blood vessel wall's capacity to allow for the flow of small molecules (such as drugs, nutrients, water, or ions) or even whole cells (such as lymphocytes on their way to a site of inflammation) in and out of the vessel. Blood vessel walls are lined by a single layer of endothelial cells. The gaps between endothelial cells (cell junctions) are strictly regulated depending on the type and physiological state of the tissue.

There are several techniques to measure vascular permeability to certain molecules. For instance, the cannulation of a single microvessel with a micropipette: the microvessel is perfused with a certain pressure, occluded downstream, and then the velocity of some cells will be related to the permeability. Another technique uses multiphoton fluorescence intravital microscopy through which the flow is related to fluorescence intensity and the permeability is estimated from the Patlak transformation.

An example of increased vascular permeability is in the initial lesion of periodontal disease, in which the gingival plexus becomes engorged and dilated, allowing large numbers of neutrophils to extravasate and appear within the junctional epithelium and underlying connective tissue.

== See also ==
- Blood–brain barrier
