= Natalie Porat-Shliom =

Israeli-American cell biologist and microscopist

- נטלי פורת-שליאום
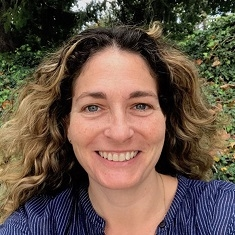
- Education: Tel Aviv University
- Scientific career
- Fields: Cell biology, intravital microscopy
- Workplaces: National Cancer Institute

Natalie Porat-Shliom (Hebrew: נטלי פורת-שליאום) is an Israeli-American cell biologist and microscopist specialized in intravital microscopy to research mitochondrial structure. She is a NIH Stadtman Investigator and head of the cell biology and imaging section at the National Cancer Institute.

== Education ==
Porat-Shliom completed a B.Sc. in biology, M.Sc. in neurobiology and Ph.D. in cell biology from Tel Aviv University (TAU). Starting in 2005, her doctoral research was performed at the National Institutes of Health (NIH), through the Graduate Partnerships Program, under the supervision of Yoel Kloog at TAU and Julie Donaldson at the National Heart, Lung, and Blood Institute (NHLBI). In 2011, as a postdoctoral researcher, Porat-Shliom joined the laboratory of Roberto Weigert at the National Cancer Institute (NCI) and National Institute of Dental and Craniofacial Research's (NIDCR) Intracellular Membrane Trafficking Section where she specialized in intravital microscopy studying mitochondria in the salivary gland for which she received the NIH Pathway to independence Award (K99/R00).

== Career and research ==
In 2018, Porat-Shliom became a tenure-track NIH Stadtman Investigator in the NCI Thoracic and GI Malignancies Branch where she heads the cell biology and imaging section. Porat-Shliom is a cell biologist with expertise in light microscopy techniques, particularly, intravital microscopy. Her lab uses a combination of molecular, biochemical and imaging approaches to investigate the principles underlying mitochondrial structure and function and the changes under pathological conditions such as cellular transformation.
