= Natali (name) =

Natali is a feminine given name. People with the name include:

== Given name ==
- Little Natali (born 1988), Cypriot singer
- Natali (singer) (born 1974), Russian musical artist and TV presenter
- Natali Dizdar (born 1984), Croatian pop singer
- Natali Morris (born 1978), American businessperson
- Natali Pronina (born 1987), Azerbaijani swimmer
- Natali Shaheen (born 1994), Palestinian football player

== See also ==
- Natali, disambiguation page
- Natali (surname), list of people with the surname
