= Natalie Wood (disambiguation) =

Natalie Wood (1938–1981) was an American actress.

Natalie Wood may also refer to:

- Natalie Wood (curator), Trinidadian-Canadian artist, curator, and educator
- Natalie Wood (coach), Australian rules footballer
