= Nezavisimaya Gazeta =

Russian daily newspaper

- Sine ira et studio
- Front page on 30 December 2010
- Type: Daily newspaper
- Format: A2 per spread
- Owner(s): Konstantin Remchukov and Elena Remchukova
- Editor: Konstantin Remchukov
- Founded: 21 December 1990
- Headquarters: Moscow, Russia
- Circulation: 40,000
- Website: ng.ru

Nezavisimaya Gazeta (Russian: Независимая газета, IPA: [nʲɪzɐˈvʲisʲɪməjə ɡɐˈzʲetə], lit. 'Independent Newspaper') is a Russian daily newspaper.

== History and profile ==
=== Soviet Union ===
Nezavisimaya Gazeta was established by the Moscow Soviet in August 1990. Its first editor was Vitaly Tretyakov, a former contributor Moskovskiye Novosti, who intended to create an independent and objective newspaper similar to Le Monde and The Independent. Its first issue was printed by the printing machine of Izvestia and published on 21 December 1990, selling 150.000 copies; additional 100.000 copies were published in French and sold as a supplement to the Courrier International.

The paper opposed the 1991 Soviet coup attempt and was briefly shut down by the State Committee on the State of Emergency. In response, journalists from Nezavisimaya Gazeta, alongside their colleagues from the main banned Russian newspapers, aided in published the illegal opposition samizdat Obshchaya Gazeta.

=== Post-Soviet era ===
==== Independent line ====
After the dissolution of the Soviet Union, Nezavisimaya Gazeta became one of the most important daily newspapers in the early post-Soviet period, when it was seen as close to the opinion of the Moscow intelligentsia. In 1992, part of the staff left the paper due to disagreements with Tretyakov and established Segodnya.

The Moscow Soviet was dissolved following the 1993 Russian constitutional crisis, and the paper was privatized and sold to its editorial board. It was temporarily closed for four months in 1995.

==== Berezovsky era ====
In 1995, Nezavisimaya Gazeta was bought by Russian oligarch Boris Berezovsky and became part of its media empire alongside daily Novye Izvestia, magazine Ogoniok and TV channels ORT and TV-6. Tretyakov was dismissed by Berezovsky in 2001 and replaced by Tatyana Koshkareva.

==== Remchukov era ====
In 2005, following Berezovsky's political and economical disgrace, Nezavisimaya Gazeta was bought by Konstantin Remchukov, who became the new editor-in-chief, and his wife Yelena. The paper remained mildly critical of the Putin administration: for example, it criticized the Kremlin's tightening control over the Central Election Commission and the Russian Academy of Science and in 2014 it was openly critical towards the annexation of Crimea by the Russia Federation. Nevertheless, Nezavisimaya Gazeta is much more moderate towards the Russian government than radical opposition publications, such as Novaya Gazeta and Meduza.

Information ranging from a wide variety of sources, such as reporters, political scientists, historians, art historians, as well as critics is published in the newspaper. The newspaper offers eight supplements and covers the issues of politics, society, culture and art. One supplement is Nezavisimoye Voyennoye Obozreniye (NVO), on military matters.
