= Intravital microscopy =

Imaging of cells in living animals

Time-lapse two-photon intravital microscopy over a period of 54 minutes: microglial cells of the brain responding to acute laser lesion in an Alzheimer's disease mouse. Microglial cells of this transgenic mouse produce GFP that allows cells to be visualised (green). The ability of microglial cells (green) to extend toward a laser lesion is reduced in Alzheimer's disease mice. β-amyloid plaques (blue) are always present in brains of Alzheimer patients .

Intravital microscopy is a form of microscopy that allows observing biological processes in live animals (in vivo) at a high resolution that makes distinguishing between individual cells of a tissue possible.

In mammals, in some experimental settings a surgical implantation of an imaging window is performed prior to intravital microscopy. This allows repeated observations over several days or weeks. For example, if researchers want to visualize liver cells of a live mouse they will implant an imaging window into mouse's abdomen. Mice are the most common choice of animals for intravital microscopy but in special cases other rodents such as rats might be more suitable. Animals are usually anesthetized throughout surgeries and imaging sessions. Intravital microscopy is used in several areas of research including neurology, immunology, stem cell studies and others. This technique is particularly useful to assess a progression of a disease or an effect of a drug.

== Basic concept ==
Intravital microscopy involves imaging cells of a live animal through an imaging window that is implanted into the animal tissue during a special surgery. The main advantage of intravital microscopy is that it allows imaging living cells while they are in the true environment of a complex multicellular organism. Thus, intravital microscopy allows researchers to study the behavior of cells in their natural environment or in vivo rather than in a cell culture. Another advantage of intravital microscopy is that the experiment can be set up in a way to allow observing changes in a living tissue of an organism over a period of time. This is useful for many areas of research including immunology and stem cell research.
High quality of modern microscopes and imaging software also permits subcellular imaging in live animals that in turn allows studying cell biology at molecular level in vivo. Advancements in fluorescent protein technology and genetic tools that enable controlled expression of a given gene at a specific time in a tissue of interest also played an important role in intravital microscopy development.

The possibility of generating appropriate transgenic mice is crucial for intravital microscopy studies. For example, in order to study the behavior of microglial cells in Alzheimer's disease researchers will need to crossbreed a transgenic mouse that is a mouse model of Alzheimer's disease with another transgenic mouse that is a mouse model for visualization of microglial cells. Cells need to produce a fluorescent protein to be visualized and this can be achieved by introducing a transgene.

== Imaging ==
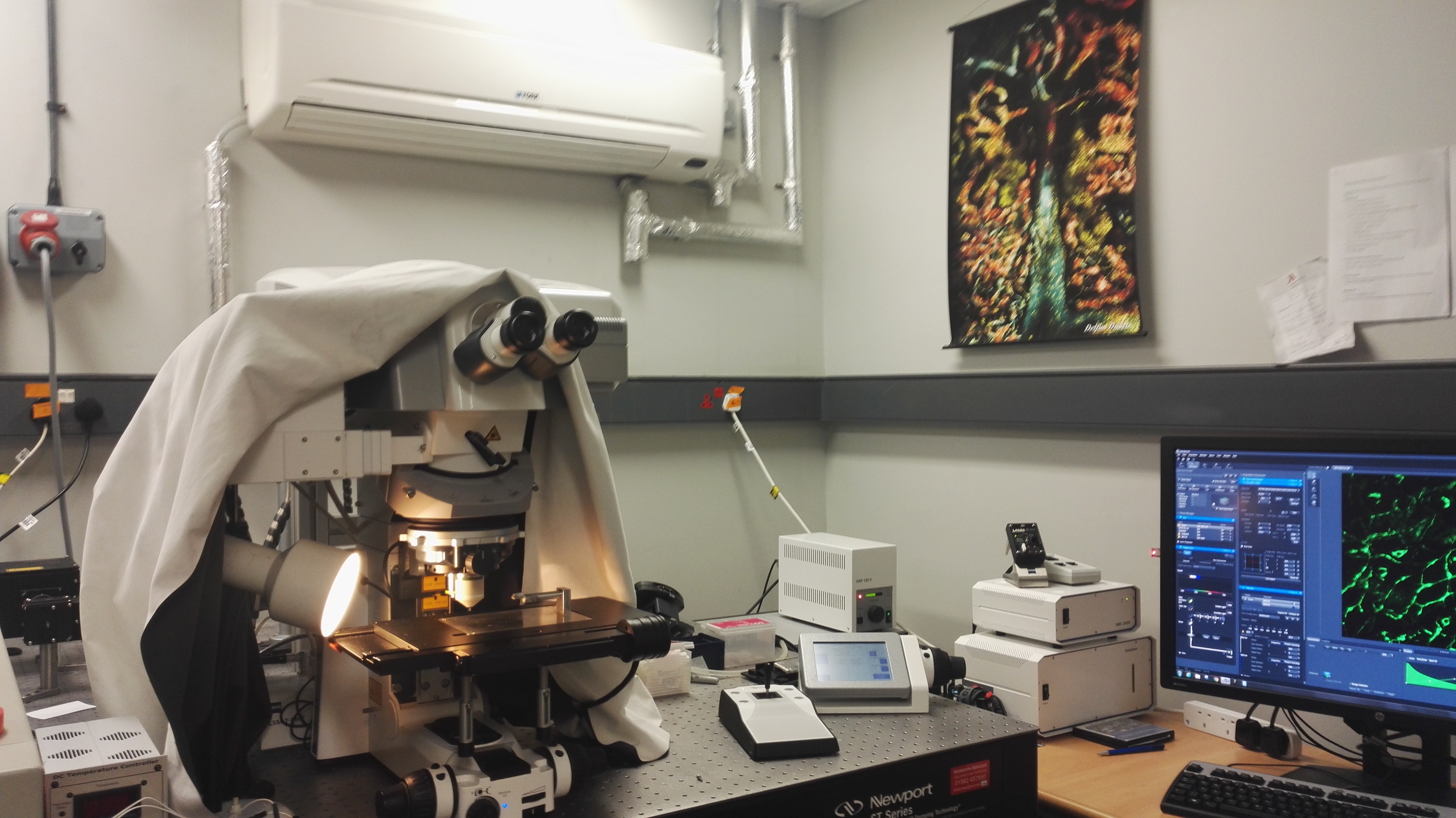
Intravital microscopy setup. Confocal microscope to collect images and PC monitor to display images generated. Equipment required to keep the animal under anaesthesia and to monitor its body temperature is not shown

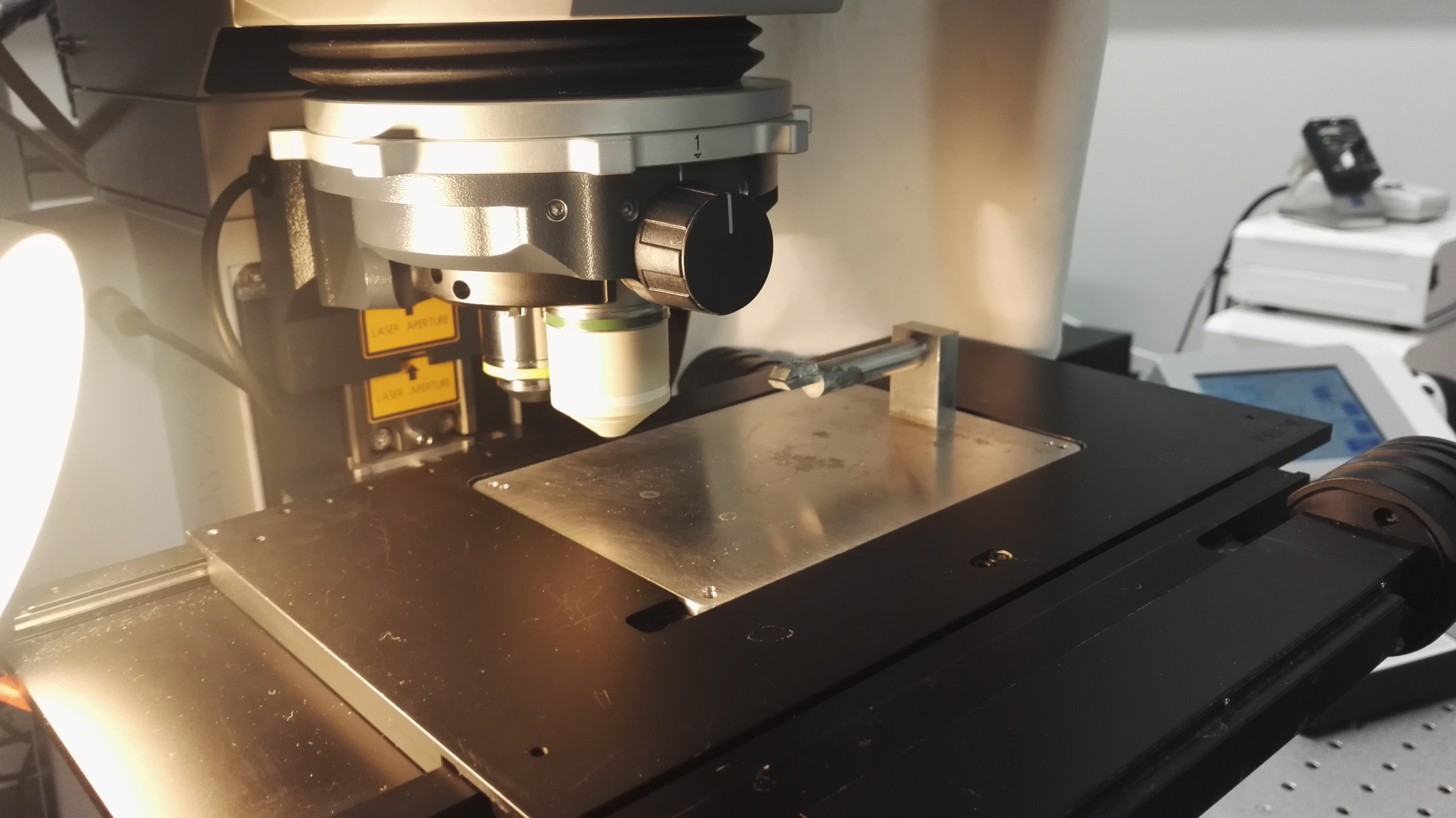
Microscope stage used for intravital microscopy imaging

Intravital microscopy can be performed using several light microscopy techniques including widefield fluorescence, confocal, multiphoton, spinning disc microscopy and others. The main consideration for the choice of a particular technique is the penetration depth needed to image the area and the amount of cell-cell interaction details required.

If the area of interest is located more than 50–100 μm below the surface or there is a need to capture small-scale interactions between cells, multiphoton microscopy is required. Multiphoton microscopy provides considerably greater depth of penetration than single-photon confocal microscopy. Multiphoton microscopy also allows visualizing cells located underneath bone tissues such as cells of the bone marrow. The maximum depth for the imaging with multiphoton microscopy depends on the optical properties of the tissue and experimental equipment. The more homogenous the tissue is the better it is suited for intravital microscopy. More vascularized tissues are generally more difficult to image because red blood cells cause absorption and scattering of the microscope light beam.

Fluorescence labeling of different cell lineages with differently coloured proteins allows visualizing cellular dynamics in a context of their microenvironment. If the image resolution is high enough (50 – 100 μm) it can be possible to use several images to generate 3D models of cellular interactions, including protrusions that cells make while extending toward each other. 3D models from time-lapse image sequences allow assessing speed and directionality of cellular movements. Vascular structures can also be reconstructed in 3D space and changes of their permeability can be monitored throughout a period of time as fluorescent signal intensity of dyes changes when vascular permeability does. High resolution intravital microscopy can be used to visualize spontaneous and transient events.
It might be useful to pair up multiphoton and confocal microscopy as this allows getting more information from every imaging session. This includes visualization of more different cell types and structures to obtain more informative images and using a single animal to obtain images of all the different cell types and structures that are of interest for a given experiment. This latter is an example of the Three Rs principle implementation.

=== Imaging subcellular structures ===
In the past, intravital microscopy could only be used to image biological processes at tissue or single-cell levels. However, due to development of subcellular labeling techniques and advances in minimizing motion artifacts (errors generated by heartbeat, breath and peristaltic movements of an animal during imaging session) it is now becoming possible to image dynamics of intracellular organelles in some tissues.

== Limitations of intravital microscopy ==
One of the main advantages of intravital microscopy is the opportunity to observe how cells interact with their microenvironment. However, visualization of all the cell types of the microenvironment is limited by the number of distinguishable fluorescent labels available. It is also widely accepted that some tissues such as brain can be visualized easier than others such as skeletal muscle. These differences occur due to variability in homogeneity and transparency of different tissues. In addition, generating transgenic mice with a phenotype of interest and fluorescent proteins in appropriate cell types is often challenging and time-consuming. Another problem associated with the use of transgenic mice is that it is sometimes difficult to interpret changes observed between a wild-type mouse and a transgenic mouse that represents the phenotype of interest. The reason for this is that genes of similar function can often compensate for the altered gene that leads to some degree of adaptation.
