= Natalie Shiyanova =

Russian actress (born 1979)

Natalie Shiyanova (born July 12, 1979, Russia) is a Russian actress.

== Biography ==
Natalie Shiyanova trained at the Moscow Art Theatre (MXAT) from 1998 to 1998, and has appeared in Russian film and television from 1998 to the present. She moved to the United States to play the lead female part in the 2009 film Victory Day. Shiyanova's character, "Oksana Tihomirova", is a woman from a small town in Russia who is unwittingly trafficked into prostitution in the west. The film is in English and Russian. It is Shiyanova's first role in English.
