= Natalie Hunter =

Natalie Hunter may refer to:

- Natalie Hunter (TV presenter)
- Natalie Hunter (canoeist) (born 1967), Australian sprint canoeist
- Natalie Marlowe, née Hunter, a character from the soap opera All My Children
