= Natalie Psaila =

Maltese doctor and advocate

Natalie Psaila is a Maltese doctor and abortion-rights advocate. She is a co-founder of Malta-based NGO, Doctors for Choice.

== Career ==
Psaila is a family medicine specialist.

Psaila has published a book for tweens on reproductive health, titled My Body's Fantastic Journey.

== Activism ==
Psaila has advocated for a loosening of Malta's strict abortion laws, as well as advocating for better access to contraception. She has received violent messages and death threats for her work. Psaila and her colleagues at Doctors for Choice have said they have seen limited action from authorities when they report these incidents.

In 2019, Psaila co-founded Doctors for Choice.

At the end of June 2023, Psaila and another doctor, Isabel Stabile, established a hotline for women who want to induce an abortion. The hotline helps patients discuss potential options abroad, and provides support for those who choose to induce abortion with medication.

== Recognition ==
In 2023, Psaila was named to the BBC's 100 Women list, becoming the first Maltese woman to receive that honor.
