= Natalie Prystajecky =

Canadian biologist

Natalie Anne Prystajecky
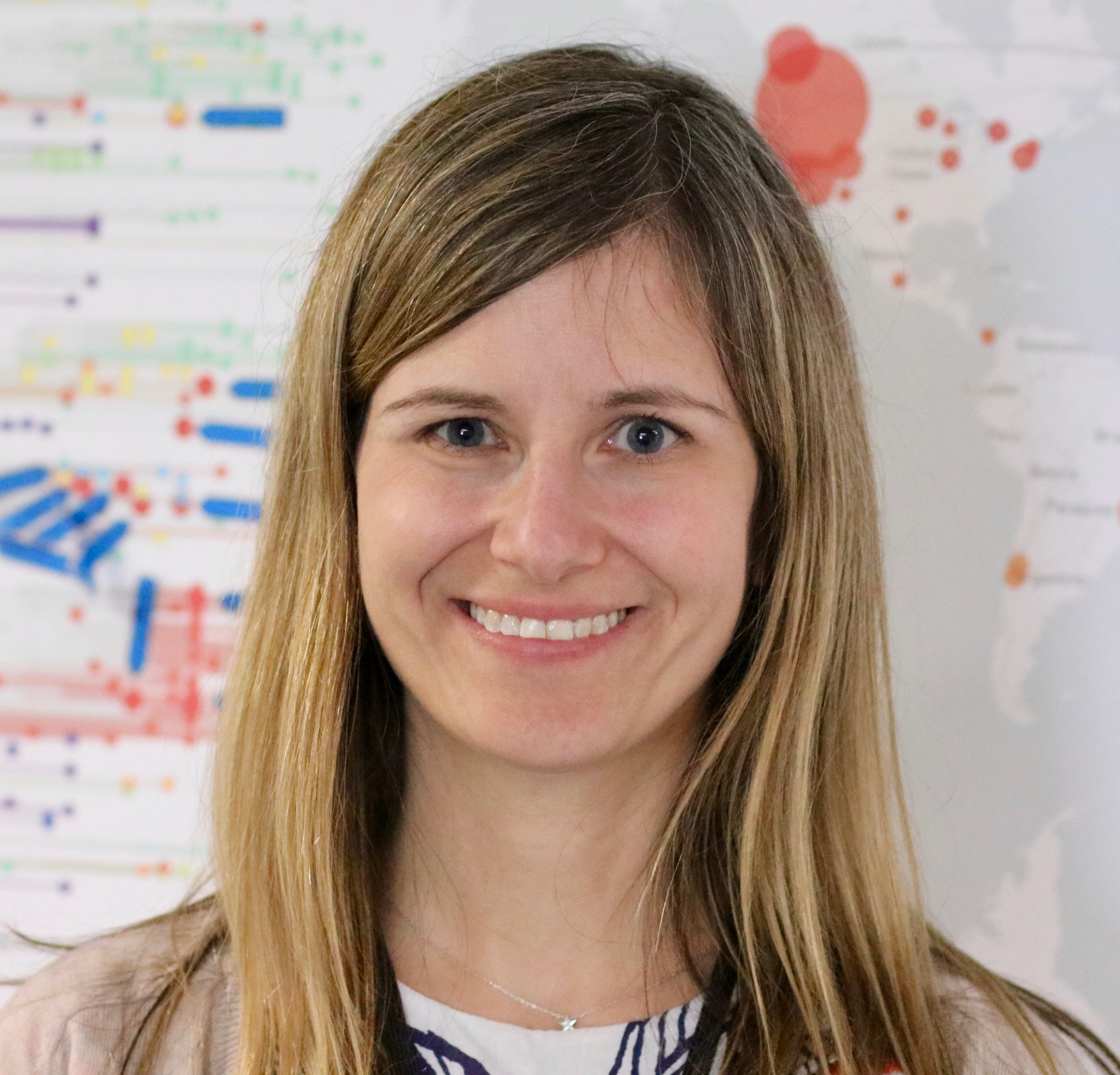
- Natalie Prystajecky in 2020
- Education: University of British Columbia; University of Calgary
- Scientific career
- Workplaces: British Columbia Centre for Disease Control; University of British Columbia
- Thesis: Molecular epidemiology of Giardia spp. in different hosts and watersheds (2010)

Natalie Anne Prystajecky a Canadian biologist who leads the Environmental Microbiology program at the British Columbia Centre for Disease Control Public Health Laboratory. She holds a clinical assistant professor position at the University of British Columbia. During the COVID-19 pandemic Prystajecky was involved with the development COVID-19 testing capabilities.

== Early life and education ==
Prystajecky studied environmental science and biology at the University of Calgary. She moved to British Columbia as a graduate student, where she first worked toward a certificate in watershed management. In 2010 Prystajecky earned her doctoral degree at the University of British Columbia. Her research considered epidemiological studies of Giardia spp.

== Research and career ==
After completing her doctorate, Prystajecky joined the British Columbia Provincial Health Services Authority, where she led British Columbians through outbreaks of norovirus and influenza. At the time, Prystajecky's advice was to “wash your hands all the time, and soap and water is the best,”.

Prystajecky leads the Environmental Microbiology program at the British Columbia Centre for Disease Control Public Health Laboratory. She investigates the relationship between environmental exposures and clinical outcomes. To do this, Prystajecky developed technology for genome s`equencing. She has used these genomic technologies to search for pathogens that might cause foodborne illnesses. Prystajecky has used metagenomics to test for bacteria and viruses in water in an effort to improve the health of people and ecosystems.

In early 2020 Prystajecky was involved in two British Columbian oyster One Health studies named UPCOAST-V for Vibrio parahaemolyticus and UPCOAST-N for Norovirus, Improved detection of the viruses will help to reduce the spread of disease and help the Canadian oyster industry.

During the COVID-19 pandemic Prystajecky was involved with the development COVID-19 testing capabilities. The first quantitative PCR acid was shared by researchers in Wuhan with World Health Organization, and forms the basis of many COVID-19 tests, including those developed by Prystajecky. In particular, Prystajecky looked to reduce the time taken between testing and obtaining results in an effort to understand transmission and protect vulnerable members of the population. The British Columbia Centre for Disease Control program that conducts the testing is known as Responding to Emerging Serious Pathogen Outbreaks using Next-gen Data (RESPOND), and makes use of genome sequencing to identify which patients have been infected by the disease.

== Selected publications ==
- Van Rossum, Thea; Peabody, Michael A.; Uyaguari-Diaz, Miguel I.; Cronin, Kirby I.; Chan, Michael; Slobodan, Jared R.; Nesbitt, Matthew J.; Suttle, Curtis A.; Hsiao, William W. L.; Tang, Patrick K. C.; Prystajecky, Natalie A. (2015-12-16). "Year-Long Metagenomic Study of River Microbiomes Across Land Use and Water Quality". Frontiers in Microbiology. 6: 1405. doi:10.3389/fmicb.2015.01405. ISSN 1664-302X. PMC 4681185. PMID 26733955.
- Uyaguari-Diaz, Miguel I.; Chan, Michael; Chaban, Bonnie L.; Croxen, Matthew A.; Finke, Jan F.; Hill, Janet E.; Peabody, Michael A.; Van Rossum, Thea; Suttle, Curtis A.; Brinkman, Fiona S. L.; Isaac-Renton, Judith (2016-07-11). "A comprehensive method for amplicon-based and metagenomic characterization of viruses, bacteria, and eukaryotes in freshwater samples". Microbiome. 4 (1): 20. doi:10.1186/s40168-016-0166-1. ISSN 2049-2618. PMC 5011856. PMID 27391119.
- Dunn, Gemma; Harris, Leila; Cook, Christina; Prystajecky, Natalie (2014). "A comparative analysis of current microbial water quality risk assessment and management practices in British Columbia and Ontario, Canada". Science of the Total Environment. 468–469: 544–552. Bibcode:2014ScTEn.468..544D. doi:10.1016/j.scitotenv.2013.08.004. hdl:2429/63620. ISSN 0048-9697. PMID 24055670.

== Personal life ==
Prystajecky has two children.
