= Natalie A. Shepard =

American politician

Natalie A. Shepard was a state legislator in Maine. She lived in Stonington, Maine and represented Hancock County, Maine in 1959 and 1961. She was a Republican.

She won a special election in 1959 after the death of her husband Myron Shepard. She defeated Girard V. Condon of Brooksville 474 votes to 240. Her husband had been serving in his second term.

She was born Natalie Alma Libby. She had a son and a daughter Jean Ann Shepard.
