= Natalie Hammond =

Natalie Hammond may refer to:

- Natalie Hays Hammond (1904–1985), American artist, author, and inventor
- Natalie Hammond (soccer) (born 2003), American soccer player
- Natalie Hammond, shot but survived in the Sandy Hook Elementary School shooting in Newtown, Connecticut
