= Natalie Banerji =

Swiss professor of chemistry

Natalie Renuka Banerji
- Born: Geneva
- Education: University of Geneva
- Scientific career
- Workplaces: University of Fribourg; University of California, Santa Barbara; University of Bern
- Thesis: Photoinduced electron transfer : from a fundamental understanding to potential applications (2009)
- Academic advisors: Alan J. Heeger

Natalie Renuka Banerji is a Swiss chemist and Professor of Chemistry at the University of Bern. She studies organic and hybrid materials using ultrafast spectroscopies. She was awarded the 2015 Grammaticakis-Neumann Prize.

== Early life and education ==
Banerji was born in Geneva, where she spent her childhood. Her mother was Austrian and her father was Indian. At school Banerji wanted to become a veterinarian, but realised that she was more interested in chemistry. Banerji eventually studied chemistry at the University of Geneva. Her doctoral research investigated photoinduced electron transfer using ultrafast (femto-second) spectroscopy. She was particularly interested in the relative geometries of the donor and acceptor materials used in photovoltaics. She has said that she was influenced by the research of Natalie Stingelin and Ursula Keller. For her postdoctoral research she moved to the University of California, Santa Barbara, where she worked with Alan J. Heeger.

== Research and career ==
In 2011 Banerji started her research group at the École Polytechnique Fédérale de Lausanne. She moved to the University of Fribourg as a Swiss National Science Foundation Professor, where she was awarded a European Research Council Starting Grant. In 2015 she was awarded the 2015 Swiss Chemical Society Grammaticakis-Neumann Prize. Her research uses organic semiconductors to transduce information from biological environments. She makes use of water-soluble conjugated polyelectrolytes dissolved in biological systems to unravel their fundamental properties. To understand these processes Banerji studies the interfaces between polyelectrolytes and biomolecules, how the optical and electronic properties of organic semiconductors is impacted by exposure to aqueous environments and the process of information transduction across interfaces. In 2017 she was appointed a Full Professor at the University of Bern.

== Select publications ==
- Sheshanath Bhosale; Adam L Sisson; Pinaki Talukdar; et al. (1 July 2006). "Photoproduction of proton gradients with pi-stacked fluorophore scaffolds in lipid bilayers". Science. 313 (5783): 84–86. doi:10.1126/science.1126524. ISSN 0036-8075. PMID 16825567. Wikidata Q50478225.
- Sarah R. Cowan; Natalie Banerji; Wei Lin Leong; Alan J. Heeger (31 January 2012). "Charge Formation, Recombination, and Sweep-Out Dynamics in Organic Solar Cells". Advanced Functional Materials. 22 (6): 1116–1128. doi:10.1002/adfm.201101632. ISSN 1616-301X. Wikidata Q117540053.
- Sarah R. Cowan; Wei Lin Leong; Natalie Banerji; Gilles Dennler; Alan J. Heeger (21 June 2011). "Identifying a Threshold Impurity Level for Organic Solar Cells: Enhanced First-Order Recombination Via Well-Defined PC84BM Traps in Organic Bulk Heterojunction Solar Cells". Advanced Functional Materials. 21 (16): 3083–3092. doi:10.1002/adfm.201100514. ISSN 1616-301X. Wikidata Q117540075.
