= Natalie Arras Tepper =

American painter

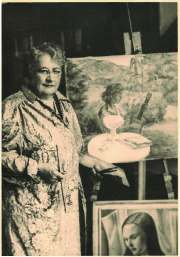
- Born: 1888; New York
- Died: 1950 (aged 61–62)
- Known for: painter

Natalie Arras Tepper (1888-1950) was an American painter of New York State scenes.

== Biography ==
Natalie Tepper worked with Guy Wiggins, Eric Pape, James McManus, and John R. Koopman.

Leon Friend, art tutor at Brooklyn's Abraham Lincoln High School, wrote:

Natalie Arras Tepper sees the broad, airy vistas of upper New York State as we should like to see them. In this, Tepper's third annual exhibition, distinct, significant areas of tones are played against each other to produce effects of modeling as solid and as vital as the substance the artist interprets. While refreshingly free in treatment, these nature-inspired melodies are nevertheless designed, not casual. The spontaneous brush-strokes are the result of the kind of forethought and understanding that accompany the master sculptor on his excursions into the stone. Thus far Tepper's every step, in the realm of painting, has been a step forward.

Natalie's works are signed in bold block letters simply N.A.Tepper.

Natalie Arras Tepper's paintings have been on exhibit at the Abraham Lincoln Gallery, Brooklyn N.Y.,; Brooklyn Museum, Brooklyn, N.Y.;, Albany Institute of History and Art, Albany N.Y.; American Fine Arts Galleries, 215W 57th Street, N.Y.

She died on Aug 5, 1950 At the time of death, Natalie Arras Tepper, relict of the late Robert Tepper, resided in Woodstock, N.Y. (and in earlier years, Brooklyn, N.Y).

Winter in Manhattan 1940, "Looking down 11th Ave. after the snow storm by Tepper, Woodstock N.Y." (on back)

== Notable works ==
- Winter in Manhattan, 1940
- Trimming the Hedges
- Houses and Figures in a Rocky Landscape
- The Home Front
- Woodstock Saw Mill
- Studio Corner
- Village Square
- Still Life
- Red Barns
- Shrine
- Shady Valley
- Blue Hills
- Doris
- Twaafskill Folks
- Impression
- Resignation
- Sheltering Green
- Quiet of a Rainy Day
- Fork of the River
- Shadow of Blue Hills
- Between Rounds
- Corn Crib and Barns
- Meadow Dawn Farm
- Road to Tiffany Farm
- Old Lyme Town Hall
- Dutch Colonial House
- The Cove
- Meadow Pond
- Betty
- Carmelita
- River Docks
- Edgewater
- Girl Resting
- Sunflowers
- The Studio
- Sunlight and Shadow
- Barns
- Landscape in Abstract
- Farm House
- Studio Interior
- Elsie
- Still Life
