= Natalie Kertes Weaver =

American author and theologian (born 1974)

Natalie Kertes Weaver (born September 20, 1974) is an American author and theologian. She is best known for her contribution to the literary anthology "Mama Ph.D" (Rutgers University Press, 2008) and her college-level textbook Marriage and Family: A Christian Theological Foundation (Anselm Academic, 2009). She is also the author and illustrator of Baby's First Latin (Booksurge, 2009), an introduction to Latin vocabulary for young children.

Weaver is Associate Professor of Religious Studies at Ursuline College (Pepper Pike, Ohio), and chairs both the Religion and Humanities Departments. She has lectured nationally and internationally on topics ranging from religion and violence to theological stances toward suffering and death.
