= Natalie Washington =

British football player and activist

Natalie Washington is a British football player and activist, best known for her work as campaign lead for Football v Transphobia, which campaigns to make football a better place for transgender people. She also serves as a trustee for Trans Pride Brighton.

She began playing as a midfielder for Rushmoor Community FC in the Hampshire County Women's Football League in 2017, after training with the team since 2015. She also appeared in charity matches for TRUK United FC. She has spoken out about facing transphobia in the sport, including an incident where she had to be substituted off the field for her safety.

In January 2017, she was allowed to play in women's football after she had six months off for genital reconstruction surgery. Her teammates on the women's team were very supportive, this had helped her feel more welcomed and accepted. This motivated her to become a trustee and organizer for the Trans Pride Brighton & Hove and Campaign Lead for the Football v Transphobia campaign.
