= Natalie Morales =

Natalie Morales may refer to:

- Natalie Morales (journalist) (born 1972), American journalist
- Natalie Morales (actress) (born 1985), American actress
