= Natalie Lima =

Author

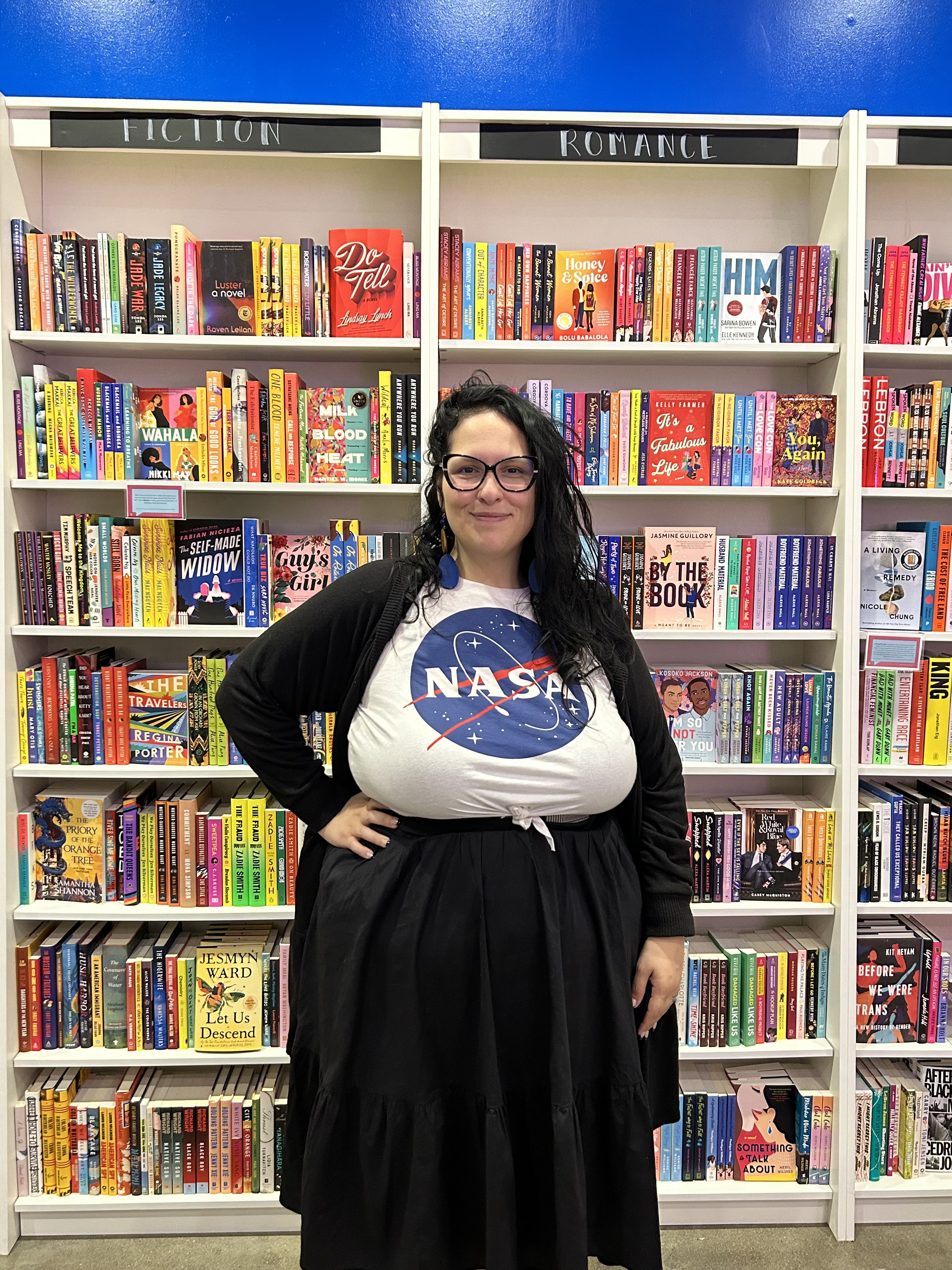
- Natalie Lima at the Loudmouth bookstore in Indianapolis, Indiana.
- Born: June 12, 1986 (age 40)
- Education: Northwestern University; University of Arizona
- Occupations: Author and creative writing professor
- Writing career
- Notable awards: Best American Essays (2019 and 2020)
- Website: natalielima.com

Natalie Lima is a Cuban Puerto Rican author who works at Butler University in Indianapolis. Her short fiction and nonfiction writings have been selected for awards and anthologies, including Best American Essays for 2019 and 2020.

== Early life and education ==
Natalie Lima was born in Miami on June 12, 1986. Growing up she lived in Hialeah and Las Vegas. Lima's family includes Puerto Rican and Cuban heritage. In an interview, she describes her upbringing as "mixed race" and "working class."

Lima is the first person from her family to earn a college degree. She completed her undergraduate degree from Northwestern University. Later she earned her MFA in Creative Nonfiction from the University of Arizona.

== Career ==
Lima began working as a creative writing professor at Butler University in 2022. Her work has been selected for the Best Small Fictions list and she has been mentioned in Best American Essays in 2019 and 2020. As a writer she has received scholarships and fellowships from notable organizations, including: PEN America, Bread Loaf, Tin House, and the Mellon Foundation. In 2020 Lima completed a residency at Hedgebrook. Lima served as a judge for the Ray Ventre Nonfiction Prize in 2021. In 2023, Literary Hub recommended Lima for readers interested in online flash fiction.

In an interview, Lima names Toni Morrison, Sandra Cisneros, Ottessa Moshfegh, Celeste Ng, Samantha Irby, Jaquira Diaz, Michelle Tea, and others as influences.

== Works ==
Natalie Lima's work has been published by Longreads, Guernica, Brevity, The Offing, Catapult, and in the anthologies Sex and the Single Woman (2022) and Body Language (2022). Lima's work includes a wide range of themes including women's bodies, gender relations, sexuality, and more. As an essayist, her life experiences often serve as subjects for creative work. For example, her struggles as a first-generation college student are central to her essay, "Snowbound."
