= Natalie Davis =

Natalie Davis may refer to:

- Natalie Zemon Davis (1928–2023), American and Canadian historian
- Natalie Davis, known as The Miniature Killer, a fictional serial killer from U.S. TV series CSI: Crime Scene Investigation
- Natalie Davis, 2011 Miss Minnesota winner
