= Natalie Price =

Natalie Price may refer to:

- Natalie Evans, a fictional character from the BBC soap opera EastEnders
- Natalie Price (politician), a member of the Michigan House of Representatives
