= Natalie Kwadrans =

Canadian-French business strategist, health advocate, and former snowboarder

- Born: Natalie Andrès; Montreal, Quebec, Canada
- Occupations: Business strategist, health advocate, author

Natalie Kwadrans (fl. 1990–) is a Canada snowboarder.

== Athletic career (1995–1998) ==
Kwadrans began snowboarding in 1990 and competed at various levels of the sport. From 1995 to 1998, she was a member of the Team Canada snowboard racing team, where she competed on the World Cup circuit.

== Professional career (1999–2019) ==
Following her athletic career, Kwadrans transitioned into the corporate sector, spending two decades as a business strategist. During this period (1999–2019), she specialized in operational efficiency and strategic growth for various Canadian organizations.

== Health advocacy (2019–present) ==
After being diagnosed with metastatic breast cancer in 2019, Kwadrans became a health and research advocate, representing patient interests within the Canadian healthcare and oncology sectors. She has commented on health, cancer, and cancer research in various media outlets.
