= Carlo Giacomo Natali =

18th-century Italian priest and author

Carlo Giacomo Natali (21 December 1730 – 28 June 1791) was an Italian priest and author.

== Biography ==
He was born in Bussana. He joined the ecclesiastical Padri of the Scuole Pie (Piarist order) in 1749 in Rome, and changed his name to Martino Natali. In Rome, he completed a doctorate in philosophy and theology at the collegio Calasanzio. He taught theology in the collegio Nazareno in Rome, where he became close with some clerics with Jansenist leanings. He argued for the supremacy of the doctrine of St Augustine versus the modern dogma of Leclerc and Daillé. He was briefly sent to Urbino by pope Clement XIII to teach rhetoric. He enjoyed some protection by the cardinal Ganganelli, who would become Pope Clement XIV in 1769. He moved to teach theology in Pavia, and there met the Hapsburg emperor Joseph II. He also contested against the theology of both Jesuits and Protestants.

His published letters and opinions (mostly written under pseudonyms) were often contentious debates about dogma and catechism. He argued for restricting church dogma solely to beliefs attested by scriptures and by long-standing tradition Church traditions. He wished to limit the role of the pope in setting dogma, and urged that the church follow the beliefs of St Augustine on grace, predestination, and original sin. He went so far as to argue that death prior to baptism withdrew an infant from God's protection, and led to his damnation. These pamphlets often brought him into conflict with one group or another, even once bringing up an accusation of heresy. Among his works are:

- Complexiones Augustinianae de gratia Christi
- Dell'esistenza e degli attributi di Dio, della Trinità, della Creazione e della grazia
- Sentimenti di un Cattolico sulla predestinazione de' Santi
- Lettera al padre Mamachi sul limbo del s.s. PP.
- Lettera contra la teologia morale di Collet (Collet was an ally of the anti-jansenist Honoré Tournély)
- Reflessioni sul breve di Pio VI contra Eybel
- Defesa della sue correzioni al catechismo del Bellarmino
