= Natalie Brown (singer) =

Canadian singer

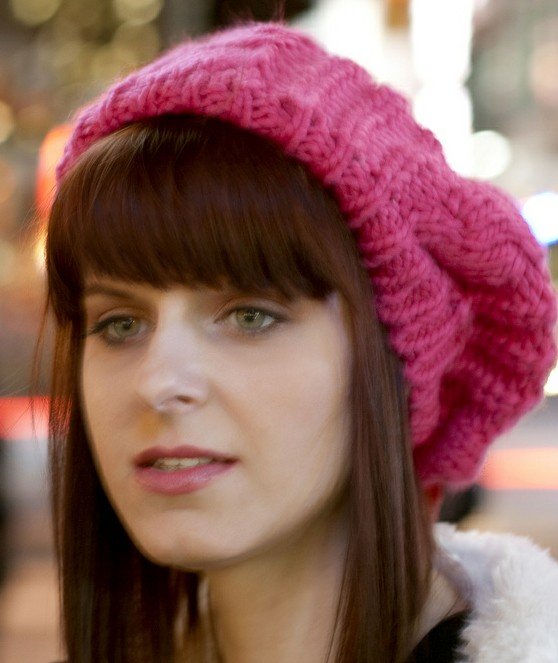

Background information
- Birth name: Natalie Frances Brown
- Born: December 19, 1978 (age 46)
- Origin: San Francisco, California
- Genres: Pop, blue-eyed soul
- Occupation: singer-songwriter
- Instrument: voice
- Years active: 1998–present
- Labels: Identity Music Group, Inc.
- Website: www.natalie-brown.com

Natalie Brown is a Canadian-born pop and blue-eyed soul singer-songwriter.

== Career ==
In 2000, Brown released her debut album Let the Candle Burn. Her single Run Away was featured along with songs from major-Label artists in Promo-Only's Rhythm Radio series. Her songs have been played on online and commercial radio world-wide. Billboard Magazine featured her in an article about emerging Her track Confused received an honorable-mention in the 2001 Billboard Song contest. Let the Candle Burn won the Just Plain Folks Music Organization award for Best R&B Song of 2001. The album was runner-up for JPF's Best R&B Album 2001. In 2003, Christmas album A Cool Christmas, a ten-song R&B/pop-influenced collection of holiday favorites was released online, followed by the release of Brown's singles "I Wonder" and "Queen of Me"; "Queen of Me" was released by AVEX Records, Japan on Soul Essentials 7, together with songs by Rahsaan Patterson, Earth Wind & Fire, and others.

== Discography ==
=== Albums ===
- November 14, 2000: Let the Candle Burn
- December 4, 2003: A Cool Christmas
- January 30, 2009: Random Thoughts
- January 17, 2012: The Relationship Odyssey

=== Singles ===
- May 21, 2000: "You Gotta Believe"
- October 17, 2000: "Let the Candle Burn" (limited cd-single)
- January 5, 2001: "Run Away" (only single to be released to major radio stations)
- June 12, 2004: "Queen of Me"
- September 14, 2008: "I Wonder"
- June 16, 2017: "You're No Good"
