= Natalie Mwagale =

Kenyan basketball player (born 1993)

No. 6 – Kenyan Ports Authority
- Position: Point Guard
- League: Kenya Basketball National League

Personal information
- Born: September 7, 1993 (age 33) Mumias
- Listed height: 5 ft 5 in (1.65 m)

Career information
- High school: Bulimbo Girl's High School
- College: Technical University of Kenya
- Playing career: 2011–present

Career history
- 2013: EAGLE WINGS
- 2014 to present: Kenya Ports Authority

Career highlights
- ACCW 2013 - Bronze Medalist Zone 5 club championship Gold medalist 2013, 2016, 2017, 2019, 2021 Zone 5 club championship 2017 - Best Point guard Zone 5 club championship 2017 - MVP KBF League 2017 - Gold medalist KBF League 2021 - Gold medalist KBF Leagues 2021 - MVP

Natalie Mwagale (born September 7, 1993) is a Kenyan basketball player. She plays for the Kenyan Ports Authority and the Kenya women's national basketball team.

== Professional career ==
Mwagale plays for the Kenyan Ports Authority Basketball team. She participated in the 2023 Africa Women's Basketball League where she averaged 8.7 points, 5.7 rebounds, and 7.6 assists.

== Kenyan National Women's Basketball team ==
Mwagale plays 3x3 basketball for the Kenya 3x3 basketball national team. She also plays for the Kenya women's national basketball team, She participated in the 2021 Women's Afrobasket tournament, where she averaged 8 points, 4.7 rebounds, and 4.3 assists.
