= Natalie Ogg =

American fashion model

- Born: San Diego, California, U.S.
- Occupation: Model
- Years active: 2018–present
- Modeling information
- Height: 5 ft 11 in (180 cm)
- Hair color: Dark blonde
- Eye color: Hazel
- Agency: The Society Management (New York City); Elite Model Management (Paris); Why Not Model Management (Milan); Select Model Management (London); VISION Los Angeles (Los Angeles)

Natalie Ogg is an American fashion model.

== Early life and career ==
Ogg is a biology student at the University of California, San Diego after transferring from New York University.

Ogg debuted as a semi-exclusive for Alexander Wang in the F/W 2018 season. That season she also walked for Salvatore Ferragamo, Versace, Calvin Klein, Prada, Burberry, Fendi, Valentino, Alexander McQueen, Chanel, Dries Van Noten, Off-White, Loewe, Sonia Rykiel, Hermès, and Stella McCartney.

Ogg was deemed a "Top Newcomer" of 2018 by models.com.
