= Natalie Khor =

Natalie Khor Pei Kee (traditional Chinese: 許佩琪; simplified Chinese: 许佩琪; Jyutping: Heui2 Pui3 Kei4; pinyin: Xǔ Pèiqí; born 17 September 1981) is the Miss Hong Kong International Goodwill 2005.

== Early life ==
She is a single child in her family, born to a father from Malaysia and a mother from Hong Kong. Khor was born in London, raised in Hong Kong, completed in high school in the US, and went to university in Australia.

== Pageant ==
In 2005 she competed in the Miss Hong Kong Pageant. At the pageant, she won the title of Miss International Goodwill. She travelled to several countries in Southeast Asia and China to promote tourism in Hong Kong. In addition, she hosted some shows and performed in charity shows in Hong Kong.

== Career ==
After the pageant, Khor became a qualified accountant and completed a Master's degree. She has worked for the global accounting firm Deloitte Touche Tohmatsu Limited.

Khor is currently a spokesperson for Hong Kong and Shanghai Banking Corporation (HSBC). She has appeared on local financial channel talk shows, providing market commentaries.
