= Natalie Cramme-Hill =

German politician (born 1986)

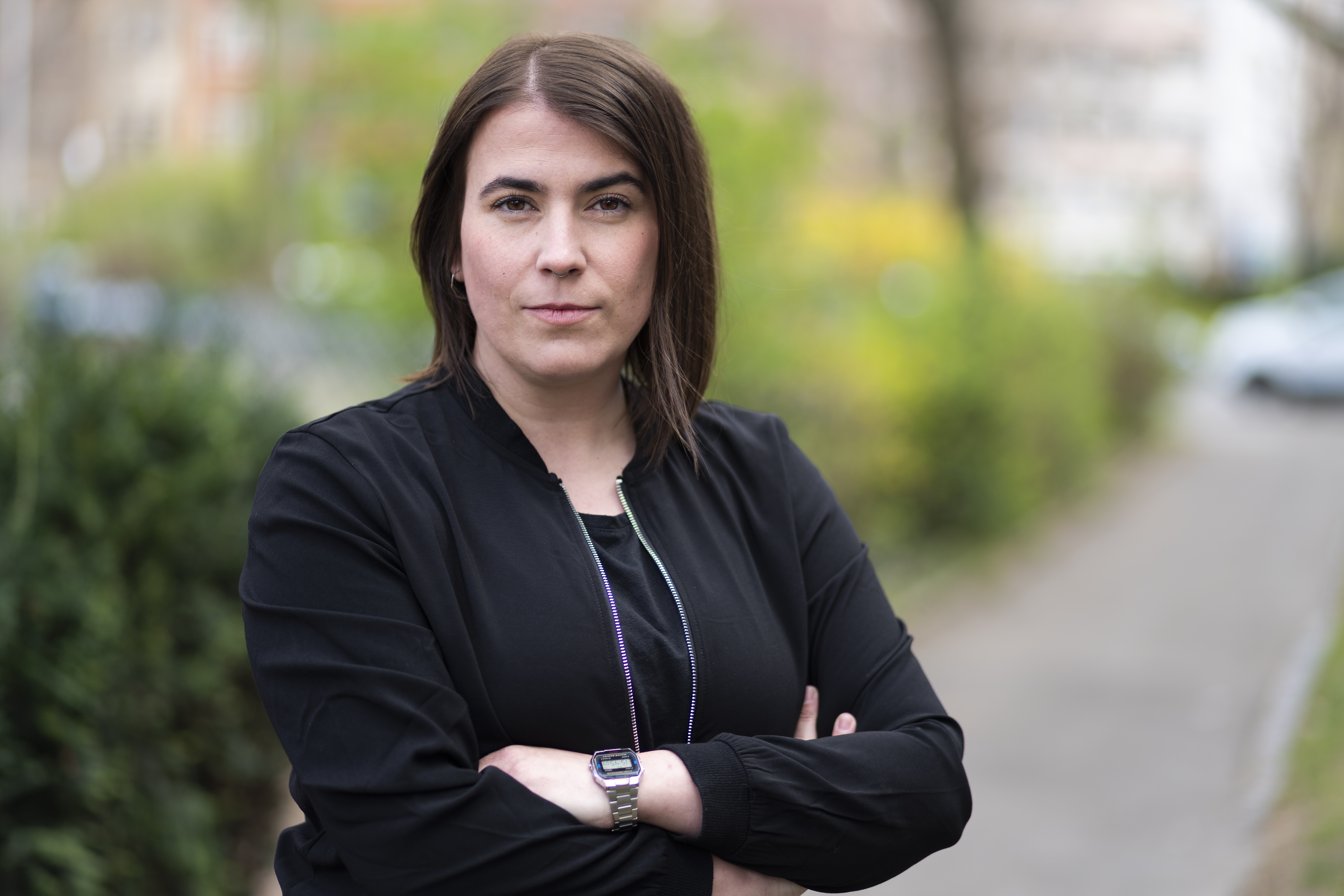
- Cramme-Hill in 2022

Member of the Landtag of Rhineland-Palatinate
- Incumbent
- Assumed office 18 May 2026

Personal details
- Born: 15 August 1986 (age 40)
- Party: Alliance 90/The Greens

Natalie Cramme-Hill (born 15 August 1986) is a German politician serving as a member of the Landtag of Rhineland-Palatinate since 2026. From 2022 to 2026, she served as co-chair of Alliance 90/The Greens in Rhineland-Palatinate.
