= Natalie Toro =

Natalie Toro may refer to:

- Natalie Toro (actress)
- Natalie Toro (politician)

== See also ==
- Natalia Toro, American particle physicist
