= Natalie Christensen =

American photographer (born 1966)

Natalie Christensen (born 1966 in Owensboro, Kentucky) is an American photographer based in Santa Fe, New Mexico, United States. She has exhibited her photographs in the U.S. and internationally, including Santa Fe, New York, Brooklyn, Los Angeles, London, Berlin and Barcelona.

== Education ==
Christensen received her BA Psychology from Western Kentucky University and her MSW Social Work from the University of Kentucky in 1991.

== Career in psychotherapy ==
A licensed clinical social worker, Christensen worked as a psychotherapist for over 25 years. She was particularly influenced by the theories of depth psychologist Carl Jung.

== Photography ==
The influence of her previous career in psychotherapy is evident in her photographs, as shadows and psychological metaphors are favored subjects. In Santa Fe, Christensen's work is inspired by commonplace architecture and streetscapes. Choosing to shoot in locations that may be viewed as uninspiring or even visually off-putting, she finds her images around shopping centers, apartment complexes and office parks. The challenge for her is to discover something transcendent hidden in plain sight. Scenes are stripped to color fields, geometry and shadow. They are an enticement to contemplate narratives that have no remarkable life yet tap into something deeply familiar to our experience evoking repressed desires and unexplained tension.

== Selected exhibitions ==
Christensen's photography is represented in galleries in the US and UK. The Royal Photographic Society in Bristol, United Kingdom, recently presented her artwork in a traveling museum exhibition throughout the United Kingdom. Her work has been shown at museums and exhibition centers, including Coos Art Museum; Standard Visions Billboard, Los Angeles, California; High Desert Museum, Bend, Oregon; Fort Wayne Museum of Art, Indiana; University of New Mexico School of Architecture Gallery; Peckham Levels, London; Galerie Minimal, Berlin; and Blipoint Festival, Barcelona, Spain.

== Collections ==
- Fort Wayne Museum of Art, Fort Wayne, Indiana
- University of Texas at Tyler, Tyler, Texas

== Recognition and awards ==
- Chateau d'Orquevaux, France, International Artists & Writers Residency, 2021
- Lucie Foundation, Open Call finalist 2020
- Delegation to the UAE, Embassy of the United Arab Emirates in Washington, D.C. and Meridian International Center, Dubai Design Week – Fall 2019
- International Photography Awards (IPA), Honorable Mention 2019, Professional: Architecture
- 2018 Juried Exhibition Ten Artists to Watch curated by Leigh Gleason, Curator of Collections, California Museum of Photography for Los Angeles Center for Digital Art, March 8–31, 2018
- Contemporary Photography 2008–2018 juried by Kristen Gaylord, Beaumont and Nancy Newhall Curatorial Fellow in the Department of Photography, MoMA at Site Brooklyn Gallery, Brooklyn, NY July 13 – Aug 13, 2018
- The National 2018: Best of Contemporary Photography (one of 5 invited photographers), Fort Wayne Museum of Art, Fort Wayne, IN April – July 2018
- Honorable Mention 2018 Julia Margaret Cameron Award
- Purchase Award Winner Are these chairs taken?, 33rd Annual International Exhibition 2018, Meadows Gallery, University of Texas at Tyler
- Top finalist of 48,000 entries for the Smithsonian’s 2017 15th Annual Photo Contest
- Honorable Mention 2017 Chromatic Awards

== Workshops ==
- Meow Wolf, Santa Fe, New Mexico. Frank Blazquez and Natalie Christensen – Photography Studio Workshop in the House of Eternal Return, June 1, 2019
- Royal Photographic Society, Birmingham, United Kingdom. IPE 161 Photography Workshop with Natalie Christensen, March 30, 2019^{[2]}

== Bibliography ==
Recent publications featuring Christensen include, among others, Peripheral ARTeries, Magazine43 of Hong Kong, Philippines and Germany and LandEscape Art Review, United Kingdom, feature article, Fall 2019. She is the cover artist for the recent Field Guide, a guidebook for New Mexico arts.

== Organizations ==
Colorado Photographic Arts Center, Denver, Colorado
