= Natalie Villalobos =

American diversity advocate

- Born: United States
- Education: Sonoma State University
- Employers: Google; UC Hastings Law School Center for Gender and Refugee Studies; Digg; Yahoo!
- Known for: Head of Developer Inspiration & Inclusion at Google

Natalie Villalobos is an American advocate for diversity and inclusion, working since 2020 as the Head of Developer Inspiration & Inclusion at Google. She was formerly Google's Head of Global Programs for Women Techmakers Women Techmakers is an external-facing program supporting women in technology working to improve the visibility and contributions of women at Google, and in particular at the annual developer conference Google I/O.

== Education and work ==
Natalie received a B.A in history at Sonoma State University in California, US, including one year abroad at the University of Hull, in England.

Early in her career, Natalie worked with the communities at Digg and Yahoo! (MASH and Live) as an Associate Community Manager, and managed StyleMob, a DIY social network for fashion enthusiasts."

From 2008 to 2009 Natalie consulted for the Institute for the Future where she co-led the Signtific Lab, an open source massive multi-player "thought experiment" platform for scientists and technologists to help forecast future disruptions in their fields. And in 2009 she worked as the Arts and Culture Manager for The Seasteading Institute on the development of Ephemerisle - "a floating festival of politics, community, and art".

In 2010 Natalie became the Community Manager for Google+. After working in this role for a couple of years she saw a need to support women in technology and improve their visibility and contributions at their developer conferences and events. In 2013 the position Head of Global Programs for Women Techmakers at Google was created at her request. The team's mission is to provide visibility, community, and resources for women in tech globally, engaging 100,000 women annually across 190 countries. Since its creation, the team has grown Google's 'Women Techmakers' event from an annual event into a scalable program operating in over 50 countries.

Natalie is an advisor for X Prize Foundation on the Anu & Naveen Jain Women's Safety Prize.

After joining New York Times as Vice President of Inclusion, Villalobos came under fire on April 3, 2023 for asking LGBTQ staffers not to raise workplace concerns on a Slack channel dedicated to employee concerns. "Several Times employees directly replied to Villalobos to question what prompted her post’s timing and how her suggestions could make LGTBQ staffers feel unsafe at the paper."

== Recognition ==
In 2011 Natalie was promoted as one of 35 personalities to add to your Google+ by The Huffington Post. and one of the top 13 Google insiders to follow on Google+ by Business Insider. And in 2012 was voted one of the Top 20 Women in Tech to Follow on Google+ by CBS News.
