= Natalee =

Natalee is a female given name. It is a variant of the name Natalie, though uncommon according to the U.S. Census Bureau. Notable people with the name include:

- Natalee Caple (born 1970), Canadian author of novels and poetry
- Natalee Holloway (born 1986), American who disappeared in Aruba in May 2005
- Natalee Scripps (born 1978), New Zealand cricketer

== See also ==
- Loving Natalee: A Mother's Testament of Hope and Faith, a 2007 American book about the disappearance of Natalee Holloway
- Natalee Holloway (film), a 2009 American television film about the disappearance of Holloway
- Nathalie
- Natalia (disambiguation)
- Natty (disambiguation)
- Natasha
