= Natalie Taylor =

Natalie Taylor may refer to:

- Natalie Taylor (basketball) (born 1982), New Zealand basketball player
- Natalie Taylor (singer) (born 1986), American singer-songwriter
