= Natalie Scala =

American industrial engineer

Natalie M. Scala
- Education: Ph.D. in Industrial Engineering
- Alma mater: University of Pittsburgh
- Occupations: Professor, Researcher
- Known for: Research in cybersecurity, voting systems, and public welfare
- Awards: University of Maryland Board of Regents Award for Public Service

Natalie M. Scala is a professor in the College of Business and Economics at Towson University, where she is also the co-director of the Empowering Secure Elections research lab. Scala's research focuses on decision analysis and risk assessments, emphasizing election security and problems that broadly impact defense and security policy. She holds a multi-year fellowship in the Center for Interdisciplinary and Innovative Cybersecurity at Towson University.

== Early life and education ==
Scala attended John F. Kennedy High School in Warren, Ohio.

== Career ==
=== Graduate work ===
Scala's dissertation, "Spare Parts Management for Nuclear Power Generation Facilities" studied intermittent demand for spare parts at United States nuclear power plants. This problem is distinct, as electric power generation deregulation began in the United States, and the generation side of utilities was no longer guaranteed cost recovery for inventory holding costs. Furthermore, nuclear power plants in the United States are uniquely designed, which limits the ability to pool inventory between units within the same generation fleet. Deregulation caused a culture shift within the nuclear generation community, as spares now needed a business case for holding on-site. In contrast, the community still considered having spares on hand only a safety and security issue. Scala's dissertation work was at the forefront of this shift, building a risk assessment for parts to hold on-site while balancing safety concerns, single points of failure within nuclear power plants, and other concerns related to critical infrastructure. Her work led to a substantial reduction in spare inventory at the case study company, and the methodology has been cited numerous times in the literature. Academically, this work is significant because it creates an inventory-holding policy for nuclear spares, which many exhibit demand so intermittently that even applying Croston's method results in poor predictions.

While at Pitt, Scala worked with a Fortune 500 electric utility to redesign the facility layout of a parts warehouse at a nuclear power plant. She also interned at the RAND Corporation, working on inventory models for Project Air Force.

=== Election security ===
Scala co-directs the Empowering Secure Elections research lab at Towson University, which defines threats to the integrity of votes as systemic and an interplay between cyber, physical, and insider sources. The lab has been active since 2017 and focuses on risk in voting systems, attack trees and strength of threat in mail voting, chain of custody of votes throughout the supply chain, and poll worker education.

During the 2020 election cycle, the lab created online training for poll workers in Maryland. The training was offered to 1900 poll workers in Anne Arundel County and focused on identifying potential cyber, physical, and insider threats if they would emerge in real-time. Poll workers were trained to identify threats or issues and then empowered to mitigate or report them. A research study showed that poll workers' knowledge about threats increases, with statistical significance, after interacting with the lab's training. This work was nationally honored by the U.S. Elections Assistance Commission with a Clearie Award for its contributions to cybersecurity and technology in elections.

Also, in 2020, the lab completed a study on risks associated with voting by mail in the United States. The political discourse in the country at the time suggested that voting by mail would be ripe with fraud. Still, many Americans were also looking for safe, socially distant methods for voting during the COVID-19 pandemic. At the same time, mail voting, primarily used as a small absentee process in the United States, was being expanded to a form of voting that was eventually used by over 40% of the electorate during the 2020 General Election. The lab used analytics and data to study the mail voting process, examining if the quick scale-up of mail voting increased risk and impacted integrity within the process. The study revealed that mail voting was secure and that the threats of most concern were unrelated to the pandemic or the process at scale. The non-partisan research results helped assure Americans of the integrity of their votes by mail.

Currently, the lab is federally funded to study potential threats to in-person voting, particularly precinct count optical scanner machines. The scope of work includes risk assessments for threat scenarios and mitigation analysis.

== Books ==
- Handbook of Military and Defense Operations Research, co-edited with James Howard, Chapman and Hall/CRC, New York, 2020, ISBN 9780429467219
- Mathematics in Cyber Research, co-edited with P.L. Goethals and D.T. Bennett, CRC Press, February 2022, ISBN 978-0367374679
- Handbook of Military and Defense Operations Research, 2nd ed., co-edited with James Howard, CRC Press, August 2024, ISBN 978-1032497488
