= Natalie Moszkowska =

- Born: 1 May 1886; Warsaw, Poland
- Died: 26 November 1968 (aged 82); Zürich, Switzerland
- Education: University of Zurich

Signature
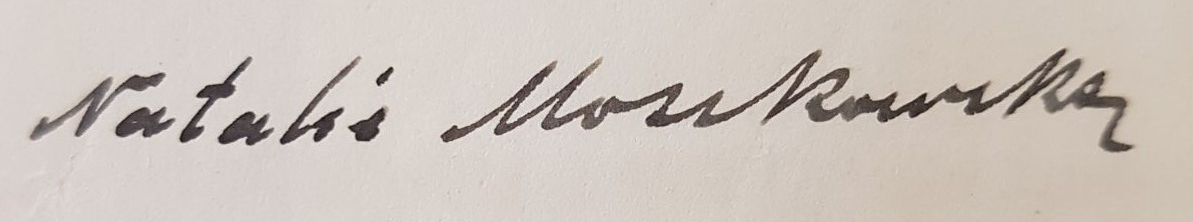

Natalie Moszkowska (1 May 1886 – 26 November 1968) was a Polish socialist economist, who provided significant contributions to the Marxian theory of value and crisis regarding monopoly capital, and to the economic interpretation of military expenditures.

== Life and career ==
Natalie Moszkowska was born in 1886 in Warsaw, Poland, to Alexander Moszkowski and Eveline Juhwihler. She was a member of the Polish Social Democratic Party. Around 1900, following persecutions on behalf of the tsarist government, she emigrated from the Russian Empire to Switzerland, where she enrolled at the University of Zurich. In July 1914, Moszkowska received a doctorate of economics (doctor oeconomiae publicae), supervised by Heinrich Sieveking. Her dissertation focused on the bank savings of workers in the coal and steel industries in Poland. Her research used Russian documents, accessed while in the Kingdom of Poland in 1911. At the end of 1918, after the October Revolution in 1917, and during the November Revolution in Germany, the Swiss authorities suspected Moszkowska of supporting Bolshevism. When Moszkowska and Leiba Chaim Kaplan remained longer than planned in the Alpenhotel in Weesen-Amden, Switzerland, the cantonal police of Saint Gall watched with suspicion the "Russian pair", who received registered mail on a regular basis.

In 1923, Moszkowska worked in Zürich as a tutor, and wrote for the union and socialist press, publishing three books and many articles. She belonged to the Swiss Socialist Party and participated in debates on economics. She maintained contacts with the international scientific community, including Maurice Dobb, Adolph Lowe and Edgar Salin. She never married, and died on 26 November 1968.

== Major publications ==
=== Das Marxsche System (1929) ===
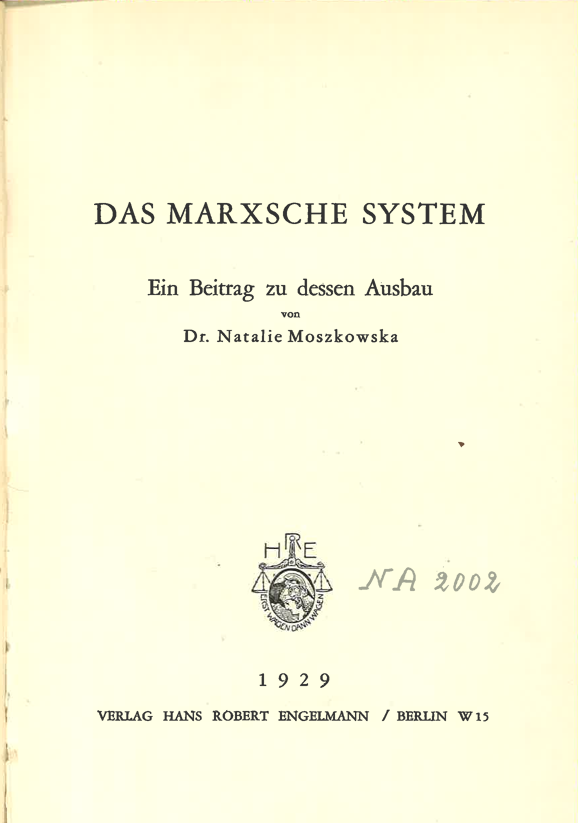
Cover page of Moszkowska's book (1929). Das Marxsche System. Ein Beitrag zu dessen Ausbau

Moszkowska's first book after her thesis was The Marxist System (Das Marxsche System), published in 1929 by the Berlin editor Robert Engelmann. The first part of the book defends the labour theory of value, similar to the point of view of Ladislaus von Bortkiewicz. Moszkowska used an unusually high number of digital examples of the transformation of value into the price of production.

In the second part of the book, similar to Bortkiewicz, Moszkowska criticised Marx's treatment of the decline in the rate of profit, which he explained in volume III of his book Das Kapital. Moszkowska supported the introduction of the capitalists' new machine only if the cost of production were at least as much paid work. Thus all new advanced technologies would increase productivity, affecting the rate of profit by increasing the average production of a single worker. Her technical analysis was later known as Okishio's theorem: sustainable innovations that reduce the rate of profit are directly linked to a rise of real wages. She concluded that the tendency of the rate of profit to decline should not be interpreted as a historical prediction, but as a functional relationship between the rate of appreciation and the rate of profit. In other words, it could be explained by "the law of the tendency of the rate of profit to fall" and "the law of the upward trend in the rate of exploitation", the latter which prevailed.

In the third part of her book, Moszkowska applied her conclusions to the theory of the crisis, but rejected the model of the rate of profit contained in volume III of Marx's Das Kapital. She opposed the idea that the disproportion of the various types of production caused economic cycles, and believed that the fundamental disproportion in the capitalist economy was caused by distribution. An excessive share of profit led to the over-accumulation of capital, and caused crises of under-consumption, while real wages increased and unemployment decreased quickly. The result was lower profitability, which would end prosperity. Moszkowska believed under-consumption was the strongest explanation.

=== Zur Kritik moderner Krisentheorien (1935) ===
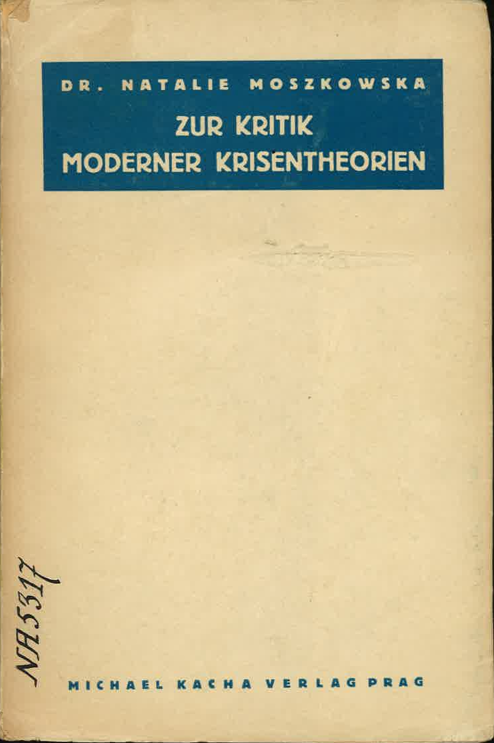
Cover page of Natalie Moszkowska's book (1935). Zur Kritik Moderner Krisentheorien.

In her second work, Criticism of Modern Crisis Theories (Zur Kritik moderner Krisentheorien), published in 1935, Moszkowska criticised the existing theories of crisis described by German and Austrian socialist authors, such as Adolph Lowe, Emil Lederer, Henryk Grossmann, Otto Bauer and Gustav Landauer. The book covered the period of depression, a topic on people's minds at the time the book was released.

Moszkowska supported wages that follow the growth of work productivity, such that the share of wages would remain constant and balanced. She considered that technical progress, a subject she developed in her previous book, is synonymous with the rise of the rate of profit. She believed appreciation would increase due to the disparate adjustment in prices. Wages and the price of raw materials would decrease faster than the price of manufactured goods.

Moszkowska supported the theory of under-consumption as an explanation for the decline of capitalism:

"If the gap between the production and consumption opens beyond a certain point and if the defect of consumption reaches a certain width, relative impoverishment becomes absolute. Production will decrease and workers find themselves on the pavement. If classical capitalism was to be characterized by a relative impoverishment, modern capitalism would thus be equivalent to an absolute impoverishment. And this absolute pauperisation is large decline of capitalism, unsustainable in the long term."

The Great depression of 1930 was the proof for Moszkowska of her theory. Criticism of Modern Crisis Theories marked a turning point in her anticipation of a permanent crisis of capitalism, because of the variation growing between consumption and production.

=== Zur Dynamik des Spätkapitalismus (1943) ===
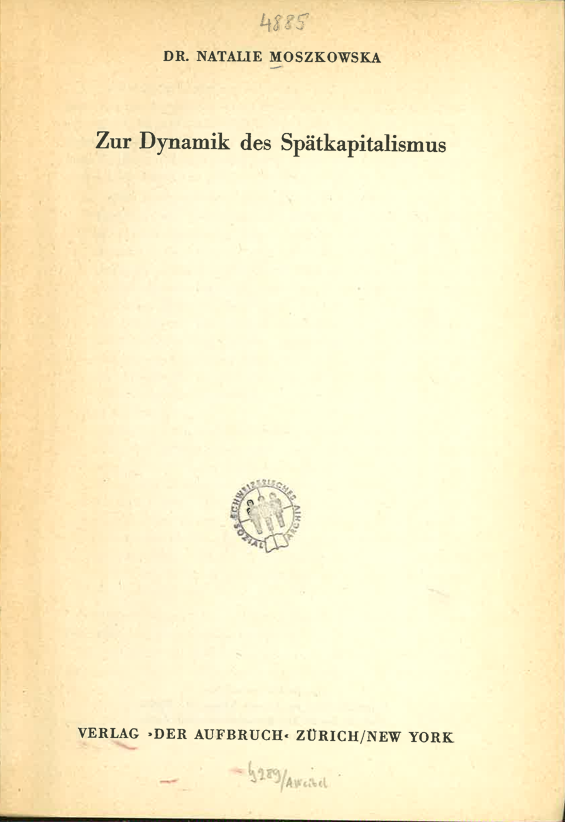
Cover page of Natalie Moszkowska's book (1943). Zur Dynamik des Spätkapitalismus.

In her third book, The Dynamics of Late Capitalism (Zur Dynamik of Spätkapitalismus), Moszkowska continued her criticism of the decreasing trend of the rate of profit by reconsidering two approaches to the theory of crises, "under-accumulation" and "over-accumulation". Under-accumulation was compatible with the modern theory of economic cycles and the analysis in volume III of Marx's Das Kapital, like the "natural" or "eternal" law of capitalism. However, according to Moszkowska, the Marxist political economy should concentrate on "social" and "historical" laws of over-accumulation (a synonym for under-consumption).

Moszkowska analysed problems caused by incidental expense or waste, which was one manner of filling the gap between the production of a company and its consumption. The misuse of resources controlled imports, or the dumping of exports, and the expenditure of armament, as well as the economic and social cost of war. She concluded that middle-class liberalism and the reform of social democracy could not remain valid, and therefore alternative forms of socialism were fascism, imperialism and war.

== List of publications ==
=== Publications ===
- Moszkowska, N. (1917). Arbeiterkassen an den privaten Berg- und Hüttenwerken im Königreich Polen: ein Beitrag zur Geschichte der Wohlfahrtseinrichtungen der Arbeitgeber. Stuttgart: Dietz Nachf. (Publication de sa thèse de doctorat de 1914).
- Moszkowska, N. (1929). Das Marxsche System: ein Beitrag zu dessen Ausbau. Berlin: Engelmann, H. R.
- Moszkowska, N. (1935). Zur Kritik moderner Krisentheorien. Prag: Neuen Weltbühne.
- Moszkowska, N. (1943). Zur Dynamik des Spätkapitalismus. Zürich: Der Aufbruch.

=== Papers selection ===
- Moszkowska, N. (1933). Kapitalnot oder Absatznot?. Rote Revue: sozialistische Monatsschrift, 31: 308–312.
- Moszkowska, N. (1938). Zum Problem der Wert- und Preisrechnung - eine Erwiderung [betr. Emil J. Walter]
- Moszkowska, N., Brügel, J.W. (1951). Kapitalismus nach den Weltkriegen. Rote Revue: sozialistische Monatsschrift, 30: 461–466.
- Thürig, W., Moszkowska, N. (1952). Der alte und der neue Faschismus. Rote Revue: sozialistische Monatsschrift, 31: 14–20.
- Brügel, J.W., Moszkowska, N. (1952). Wer hat den Kapitalismus gerettet? Rote Revue: sozialistische Monatsschrift, 12: 76–83, 288.
- Moszkowska, N. (1952). Das kapitalistische Endstadium. Rote Revue: sozialistische Monatsschrift, 31: 145–154.
- Miville, C., Moszkowska, N., V.G. (1952). Wer treibt zum Krieg? Rote Revue: sozialistische Monatsschrift, 31: 245–250.
- Moszkowska, N. (1952). Oekonomische und politische Auswirkungen der Rüstungen. Arbeit und Wirtschaft, Vienna, 6.Jg./Nr. 3
- Moszkowska, N., Zajfert, T., Bührer, J. (1954). Kleinhaltung des Massenkonsums und wirtschaftliche Entwicklung. Rote Revue: sozialistische Monatsschrift, 33: 116–123, 137–140, 165–168.
- Moszkowska, N. (1955). Hemmnisse der demokratischen Entwicklung. Der öffentliche VPOD-Dienst, 48.
- Moszkowska, N. (1955). Kreditinflation und Teuerung. Rote Revue, 34: 30–39.
- Moszkowska, N. (1958). Kapitalistische Wirtschaftswunder, Gewerkschaftliche Monatshefte, 9(4): 224–228.
- Moszkowska, N. (1959). Das Krisenproblem bei Marx und Keynes. Schmollers Jahrbuch für Gesetzgebung, Verwaltung und Volkswirtschaft, 79(6): 665–701.
- Moszkowska, N. (1960). Erwartung und Wirklichkeit, Periodikum für Wissenschaftlichen Sozialismus, 16: 5–16.
- Moszkowska, N. (1963). Wandlung der Methode und des Erkenntnisobjektes der Nationalökonomie. Schmollers Jahrbuch für Gesetzgebung, Verwaltung und Volkswirtschaft, 83(3): 269–293.
- Moszkowska, N. (1965). Methodologischer Subjektivismus in der Nationalökonomie. Schmollers Jahrbuch für Gesetzgebung, Verwaltung und Volkswirtschaft, 85: 513–524.

== Bibliography ==
- Howard, Michael. C and John E. King (2000). Natalie Moszkowska. In Robert W. Dimand, Mary Ann Dimand and Evelyn L. Forget (eds), A Biographical Dictionary of Women Economists, Cheltenham: Edward Elgar, pp. 313–317.
- Schoer, Karl (1976). Natalie Moszkowska and the Falling Rate of Profit. New Left Review, 95(1): 92–96.
- Hagemann Harald, Heinz D. Kurz and G. Magoulas (1975). Zum Verhältnis der Marxschen Werttheorie zu den Wert- und Preistheorien der Klassiker: Bemerkungen zu W. Beckers Aufsatz „Dialektik als Methode in der ökonomischen Werttheorie von Marx. Jahrbücher für Nationaloekonomie und Statistik, 189(6): 531–543.
- Arghiri, Emmanuel (1970). La question de l'échange inégal, L'Homme et la société, 18(1): 35–59.
- Groll, S. and Z. B. Orzech (1989). From Marx to the Okishio Theorem: a Genealogy, History of Political Economy, 21(2): 253–272.
- Sweezy, Paul M. (1942). The Theory of Capitalist Development. New York: Oxford University Press.
