= Natalie Kerwin =

New Zealand cyclist

Personal information
- Full name: Natalie Kerwin
- Born: 15 January 1991 (age 35)

Cycling career
- Sport: Cycling
- Discipline: Road
- Role: Rider

Professional team
- 2017: Team VéloCONCEPT Women

Natalie Kerwin (born 15 January 1991) is a New Zealand professional racing cyclist who last rode for Team Virtu Pro–Véloconcept.

== Major results ==
2014
5th Stage 1(TTT) Women's Tour of New Zealand
2016
1st Overall UCI World Gran Fondo 19–34 Women
12th Lake Taupo Cycle Challenge Women's Classic

1st Queen of the Mountain
