= Natalie Henry =

Australian musician

- Born: 21 June 1981 (age 43); Australia
- Occupations: Singer; songwriter
- Instruments: Vocals; guitar
- Years active: 2015–present
- Labels: Beverly Hillbilly Records
- Website: www.nataliehenry.com.au

Natalie Henry (born 21 June 1981), is an Australian country singer-songwriter.

== Career ==
Henry commenced her music career in 2015 at the age of 34. She and her then husband Brock released Cold Love as The Wayward Henry in 2016.

In 2018, Henry released her debut solo album Apple & Pride, addressing her marriage breakdown and emotional renewal.

In 2021, Henry signed with Beverly Hillbilly Records. In September 2021, Henry's second album, White Heat debuted at number 34 on the ARIA Chart.

== Personal life ==
Henry was married to fellow musician Brock Henry. The pair who have three daughters Gia, Luca and Eddie. Brooke and Natalie released Cold Love as The Wayward Henry in 2016 and broke up shortly after.

The break up led to Henry's realisation that she was gay and she moved onto a relationship with fellow musician Emily A. Smith.

== Discography ==
=== Albums ===
List of albums, with release date and label shown
Title	Details	Peak chart positions
Title	Details	AUS
Cold Love (as The Wayward Henrys)	Released: 9 September 2016; Label: The Wayward Henrys	-
Apple and Pride	Released: 2018; Label: Natalie Henry	-
White Heat	Released: 17 September 2021; Label: Beverly Hillbilly Records (BEVHILLREC002); Formats: CD, Digital download, streaming	34
