= Natalie Holland =

Russian painter

- Born: April 6, 1962 (age 63); St. Petersburg, Russia
- Known for: Painting

Natalie Radina Holland is a Russian-born contemporary artist, formerly based in Norway and now working in England.

== Early life and training ==
Born in St. Petersburg to Russian parents, Holland grew up near the Black Sea before commencing music studies at the age of 12. She studied both art and music at the School of Fine Arts in Novorossijsk, Russia, and eventually graduated from the Russian Academy of Arts with a degree in art.

In 1981 Holland moved to Norway with her mother, who had married a Norwegian. She studied at the Norwegian College of Marketing and worked for an advertising agency. Holland met Norwegian art's enfant terrible Odd Nerdrum, who viewed some of her figurative works and asked her to come to his studio. Her visit resulted in a two-year apprenticeship from 1990 to 1992. She had her first solo show in 1994 in Oslo and has since exhibited in several countries.

== Recent work ==
In 2009 her portrait Agnes was selected for exhibition at the BP Portrait Award at The National Portrait Gallery in London.

in 2012, Holland painted several portraits of South African Olympian Oscar Pistorius prior to the start of the 2012 Summer Olympics. One of the paintings from this set was later exhibited in the annual exhibit of the Royal Society of Portrait Painters.

== Style and subjects ==
Holland paints in a classic figurative style, her subjects including still lifes as well as portraits, but touches in her work on modern themes such as "plastic surgery, Moslem oppression of women, [and] terrorism". Some of her work is reminiscent of Nerdrum's.
