= Nathalie Lahdenmäki =

Finnish jewelry designer (born 1975)

- Born: 1975 (age 50–51)
- Occupations: Ceramic artist and jewelry designer

Nathalie Lahdenmäki (born 1975) is a Finnish ceramic artist and designer of French origins with a studio in Espoo, Finland.

Nathalie Lahdenmäki graduated with MA from University of Art and Design Helsinki (UIAH), Department of Ceramics in 1999. She works as researcher and teacher at Aalto University, School of Arts, Design and Architecture.

She is particularly known for her thin and soft porcelain pieces. She designs ceramic everyday objects as well as unique once-off pieces. Nathalie Lahdenmäki has been commissioned and designed items for companies including Arabia and Iittala.

Her work has been acquired to a number of international collections to many renowned galleries and museums: Design Museum, Helsinki, The Rhöss Museum for Design and Applied Art, Göteborg, Sweden, The Museum of Contemporary Ceramic Art, Shigaraki, Japan, Åhlens Art Association, Sweden, Arabia Museum, Helsinki, Finnish Glass Museum, Riihimäki, Finland.

She has been exhibiting extensively and held numerous solo shows in Finland, Sweden, Denmark, Switzerland and Japan. She was also included in many group shows around the world.

Lahdenmäki was a winner of many international competitions and has received numerous grants and awards for her work both nationally and internationally. She was awarded the Design Plus prize for her Fire series in Germany in 2002. In 2005 she got third place in the prestigious Mino Ceramics Competition in Japan and in 2008, together with Naoto Niidome, she was named Young Designer of the Year by The Finnish Association of Designers Ornamo.

Nathalie Lahdenmäki's Art Works collection for Iittala takes its inspiration from the material's magical character. Her pots and blocks are a dialogue of different materials and reflect on the concepts of truth, imagination and value.

== Sources ==
- http://www.nathalielahdenmaki.fi/cv.html
- https://www.iittala.com/Designers/Nathalie-Lahdenmaki/c/Nathalie%20Lahdenmaki
- https://www.youtube.com/watch?v=maC6BNOZMIw
