= Little Natali =

- Birth name: Natali Zenonos Greek: Ναταλί Ζήνωνος
- Born: 28 November 1988 (age 36); Limassol, Cyprus
- Genres: Children's music
- Occupation: singer
- Instrument: voice
- Years active: 1994–present

Natali (or "Little Natali") had a brief musical career as a child prodigy singer from Cyprus.

== Biography ==
Born in 1988 to a Greek Cypriot father and an Australian mother, Natali resides in Limassol and shares her home with her two siblings. She attended Ayios Tychonas elementary school. She studied classical piano and music theory with Nefen Michaelides, and took dance lessons at the Nadina Loizides school of ballet.

Natali began her career with an appearance at the Zecchino d'Oro festival in Bologna, Italy. Her first album, To Dromaki Mas (Our Tiny Street) (1995) containing songs composed and produced by Doros Georgiades, went on to platinum sales. Her second album was Pes to Mou (Say it to Me) (1996). Her next album was 1997's Natali's Christmas Eve.

== Discography ==
- To Dromaki Mas (1995)
- Pes To Mou (1996)
- Natali's Christmas Eve (1997)
