= Konstantin Remchukov =

Russian journalist

- Константин Ремчуков
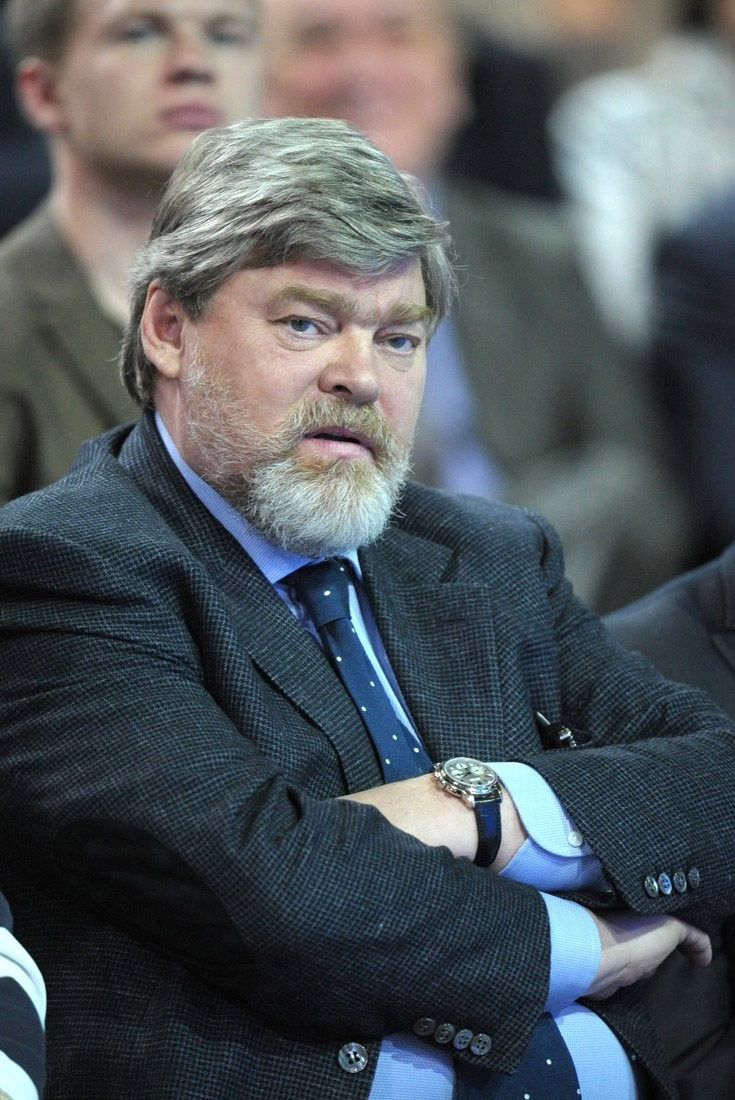
- Remchukov in 2014

Member of the State Duma
- In office 1999–2003

Personal details
- Born: Konstantin Vadimovich Remchukov; 21 November 1954 (age 71) Morozovsk, Rostov Oblast, Russian SFSR, Soviet Union
- Citizenship: Russia
- Party: Union of Right Forces
- Education: Patrice Lumumba Peoples' Friendship University of Russia; University of Pennsylvania
- Occupation: Journalist; politician; contributing editor
- Awards: Order of Friendship; Order of the Rising Sun
- Website: www.ng.ru/themes/remchukov/

Konstantin Vadimovich Remchukov (Russian: Константин Вадимович Ремчуков; born 21 November 1954) is a Russian journalist, editor-in-chief, and CEO of Nezavisimaya Gazeta". Deputy of the State Duma of the Russian Federation (1999–2003) and chair of the Public Chamber of the city of Moscow. Previously he headed the Public Council on Russia's accession to the WTO.

== Biography ==
Born on 21 November 1954 in Morozovsk, Rostov Oblast. After his parents moved, he studied in the city Volzhsky. Parents worked as school directors in Volzhsky.

In 1971 he graduated from school in the city of Volzhsky.

In 1978 he graduated from the Faculty of Economics and Law Patrice Lumumba Peoples' Friendship University with honors. Received the specialty of economist. From 1976 to 1977 he worked as an interpreter in Pakistan.

From 1978 to 1980 he served in active military service in the Soviet Army.

From 1978 to 1983, he was a postgraduate student at the Faculty of Economics and Law of the Patrice Lumumba Peoples' Friendship University. In 1984 he defended his PhD thesis in economics.

From 1983 to 1996 – Assistant Professor, RUDN University. In 1986–1987 he was an intern at University of Pennsylvania (Philadelphia, US). Some contemporaneous sources describe him as a master's degree student in finance. From 1991 to 1997, he was director of the program for Russia at the Scandinavian Management Center (Stockholm, Sweden).

From 1996 to 2000 – Head of the Department of Macroeconomic Regulation and Planning of the Faculty of Economics RUDN University. From 1999 to 2009 he was a professor at RUDN University.

From 1996 to 1998 he was a member of the Investment Committee of the Investment Fund of SEB (Sweden). From 1997 to 1999 – Senior Vice President of the Information and Analytical Center "NOVOCOM".

In 1997–1999 he was an adviser, consultant, chairman of the Supreme Scientific and Advisory Council of the Siberian Aluminum Group, in 2000–2001 he served as chairman of the Supreme Scientific and Advisory Council of IPG Sibal. After renaming to IC "Basic Element", in 2002–2003, Chairman of the Supreme Scientific and Advisory Council of "Basel".

From 19 December 1999 to 2003 – Deputy of the State Duma (from SPS), Deputy Chairman of the Committee on Natural Resources and Environmental Management and Member of the State Duma Commission on Consideration of Legal Issues of Use subsoil under the terms of production sharing.

From 10 November 2001 – Head of the Public Council under the President of the Russian Federation on Russia's accession to the WTO.

In 2001 he was elected chairman of the executive committee of the Bolshoi Theatre Board of Trustees.

In 2004–2005 – Assistant to the Minister of Economic Development and Trade.

Owner (since 2005), CEO and editor-in-chief (since 2007) of Nezavisimaya gazeta.

From 2007 to 2009 he was a member of the board of directors of Russian Venture Company.

Since April 2009 he has been a regular participant in the program "Special Opinion" on Mondays on the radio station "Echo of Moscow".

Since November 2012 – chairman of the board of directors of the football club "Anji".

Since April 2013 – Deputy Chairman of the Civic Chamber of the City of Moscow.

Since April 2016 – Chairman of the Civic Chamber of Moscow.

In 2018 he headed the campaign headquarters of Sergey Sobyanin at the Elections of the mayor of Moscow.

== Books and articles ==
Author of books on economics, including "Russia and the WTO" (2002) and "Economic policy of the "visible hand" (2003), "With a thought about Russia" (2003). Brochures “The Ethics of Power and the Metaphysics of Democracy" (2006). Permanent contributor to "Nezavisimaya gazeta"
