= Nathalie =

- Gender: female
- Language: English, French, Danish, Dutch, Swedish, German
- Name day: July 27, August 26, December 1

Origin
- Language: Latin
- Meaning: birthday or christmas

Other names
- Alternative spelling: Natalie, Natali
- Short forms: Nat, Nathy, Natty, Naty, Nathie, Natie, Natta
- Derivatives: Nathaly, Nataly

Nathalie is a female given name. It is a variant of the name Natalie/Natalia which is found in many languages, and is especially common in French and English-speaking countries.

Notable people with the name include:

- Nathalie (born 1979), Italian singer
- Nathalie Baye (1948–2026), French actress
- Nathalie Boisclair, Quebec politician
- Nathalie Boltt, South African actress
- Nathalie Carrasco, French chemist and professor of astronomy and astrophysics
- Nathalie Dechy, French former tennis player
- Nathalie Delon (1941–2021), French actress and film director
- Nathalie Demassieux (1884–1961), French chemist and academic
- Nathalie Des Rosiers (born 1959), Canadian politician
- Nathalie Doummar, Canadian playwright and actress
- Nathalie Eisenbaum, French mathematician
- Nathalie Emmanuel, British actress
- Nathalie Ferlut, French comics cartoonist
- Nathalie Gautier, French politician
- Nathalie Japkowicz, Canadian computer scientist
- Nathalie Kelley, Peruvian-Australian actress
- Nathalie Lahdenmäki, Finnish ceramic artist and designer
- Nathalie Schenck Laimbeer, American banker
- Nathalie de Leon, Filipino-American chemist and physicist
- Nathalie Lind (1918–1999), Danish politician
- Nathalie Loriers, Belgian jazz pianist and composer
- Nathalie Luca, French sociologist of religion
- Nathalie Lupino, French judoka
- Nathalie Makoma, Dutch singer, runner-up in the Dutch TV series Idols 4
- Nathalie Matar, Lebanese footballer
- Nathalie Palanque-Delabrouille, French astrophysicist, cosmologist
- Nathalie Paulding, American actress
- Nathalie Rayes, Venezuelan activist and sociologist
- Nathalie L. Rochefort, Neuroscientist
- Nathalie Rochefort, Canadian plititcian
- Nathalie Roussel, French actress
- Nathalie Simard, Canadian singer
- Nathalie Sinclair-Desgagné (born 1988), Canadian politician
- Nathalie Sarraute, Russian-born French writer
- Nathalie Stutzmann, French contralto and conductor
- Nathalie Tauziat, French former tennis player
- Nathalie van Berkel (born 1982), Dutch politician
- Nathalie Viérin, Italian tennis player
- Nathalie Yamb, Cameroonian-Swiss activist and businesswoman

== See also ==
- Natalie (given name)
- Natalia (given name)
- Natasha
