= Natasha =

- Pronunciation: /nəˈtæʃə/ nə-TASH-ə /nəˈtɑːʃə/ nə-TAH-shə
- Gender: female

Origin
- Origin: Russian

Other names
- See also: Natalia, Natalie, Nataša

Natasha is a name of Russian origin. It is the diminutive form of the Latin name Natalia.

== Notable people ==
=== A-E ===
- Natasha Adair (born 1972), American basketball coach
- Natasha Aguilar (1970–2016), Costa Rican swimmer
- Natasha Akpoti (born 1979), Nigerian politician
- Natasha Al-Maani (1959–2023), Jordanian artist
- Natasha Al-Naber (born 1995), Jordanian footballer
- Natasha Alam (born 1973), Uzbekistani-American actress and model
- Natasha Alexenko (1973–2024), American-Canadian crime victim advocate
- Natasha S. Alford (born 1986), American journalist
- Natasha Ali (born 1988), Pakistani actress
- Natasha Allegri (born 1986), American creator, writer, storyboard revisionist, and cartoonist
- Natasha Alleyne (born 1969), Trinidad and Tobago high jumper
- Natasha Alquiros (born 1991), Filipina international footballer
- Natasha Ambo (born 1997), Papua New Guinean cricketer
- Natasha Anasi (born 1991), Icelandic and American footballer
- Natascha Artin Brunswick (1909–2003), German-American mathematician and photographer
- Natasha Arthy (born 1969), Danish screenwriter, film director and producer
- Natasha Asghar (born 1983), Welsh politician
- Natasha Bacchus (born 1977), Canadian sprinter
- Natascha Badmann (born 1966), Swiss triathlete
- Natasha Badhwar (born 1971), Indian author
- Natasha Bagration (1914–1984), Georgian noblewoman
- Natasha Baig (born 1992), Pakistani singer-songwriter
- Natasha Baker (born 1989), British para-equestrian
- Natasha Bargeus (born 1971), Australian basketball player
- Natasha Barker (born 1970), Australian weightlifter
- Natasha Barrett (disambiguation), several people
- Natasha Bassett (born 1992), Australian actress
- Natasha Beaumont (born 1974), Malaysian-Australian actress
- Natasha Bedingfield (born 1981), British singer
- Natasha Behnam, American actress
- Natasha Bertrand (born 1992), American journalist
- Natascha Bessez (born 1986), American singer
- Natasha Bharadwaj, Indian actress
- Natasha Boas (born 1964), French-American writer and critic
- Natasha Borovsky (1924–2012), American poet
- Natasha Bowdoin (born 1981), American artist
- Natasha Bowen, Nigerian Welsh writer
- Natasha Braier (born 1974), Argentine cinematographer
- Natasha Brennan (born 1986), English rugby union player
- Natasha Brown (author), British novelist
- Natasha Brown, American news anchor and reporter
- Natasha Burian, Seychellois judge
- Natasha J. Cabrera, Canadian developmental psychologist
- Natasha Calis (born 1999), Canadian actress
- Natasha J. Caplen, British-American geneticist
- Natasha Carter (born 1986), British journalist and TV presenter
- Natasha Caruana (born 1983), photographic artist
- Natasha Chmyreva (born 1958), Russian tennis player
- Natasha Chokljat (born 1979), Australian netball player
- Natasha Choufani (born 1989), Lebanese actress
- Natasha Cloud (born 1992), American basketball player
- Natasha Coates (born c. 1995), British disabled gymnast
- Natasha Cockram (born 1992), Welsh marathon runner
- Natasha Collins (1976–2008), British actress and model
- Natasha Cooper, English crime fiction writer
- Natasha Cornett (born 1979), American murderer
- Natasha Corrett (born 1983), British chef and food writer
- Natasha Curry, American journalist and television host
- Natasha Daly (born 1979), English footballer
- Natasha Daultana, Pakistani politician
- Natasha David (born 1985), German bartender known for cocktail recipes
- Natasha Demkina (born 1987), Russian woman who claims to possess X-ray vision
- Natasha Desborough (born 1974), English radio presenter
- Natasha Devon (born 1981), writer, campaigner and broadcaster
- Natasha Devroye, Belgian and Canadian information theorist
- Natasha Domínguez (born 1990), Venezuelan actress
- Natasha Donovan, Canadian illustrator
- Natasha Doshi (born 1993), Indian film actress
- Natasha Dowie (born 1988), English football player
- Natasha Dupeyrón (born 1991), Mexican actress
- Natasha Eloi, English-Canadian television personality and videographer
- Natasha England (born 1952), Scottish singer
- Natasha Exelby, Australian journalist

=== F-L ===
- Natasha Falle (born 1973), Canadian human rights activist
- Natasha Farinea (born 1986), Brazilian volleyball player
- Natasha Farrant, British children’s author
- Natasha Fatah (born 1980), Canadian journalist
- Natasha Ferreira (born 1999), Brazilian judoka
- Natasha Rosa Figueiredo (born 1996), Brazilian weightlifter
- Natasha Firman (born 1976), English racing driver
- Natasha Fisher, Canadian aboriginal musician
- Natasha Flint (born 1996), English football player
- Natasha Flyer (born 1969), American earth scientist and applied mathematician
- Natasha Fourouclas (born 1994), South African tennis player
- Natasha Fox, Australian Army officer
- Natasha Friend (born 1972), American author
- Natasha Fyles (born 1978), Australian politician
- Natasha Gajewski, American business executive
- Natasha Gale (born 1988), English boxer
- Natasha Sara Georgeos (born 1987), Saint Lucian swimmer
- Natasha Goldowski Renner, 20th-century physicist
- Natasha Gordon (born 1976), British playwright
- Natasha Gregson Wagner (born 1970), American actress
- Natasha Grey-Brookes (born 1981), Saint Kitts and Nevis politician
- Natasha Griggs (born 1969), Australian politician
- Natasha Grillo (born 1995), Italian cyclist
- Natascha Hagen, Austrian singer-songwriter
- Natasha Halevi (born 1982), American actress and director
- Natasha Hamilton (born 1982), British singer
- Natasha Hamilton-Hart (born 1969), New Zealand business academic
- Natasha Hansen (born 1989), New Zealand cyclist
- Natasha Harding (born 1989), Welsh footballer
- Natasha Hastings (born 1986), American sprinter
- Natasha Hastings (writer), British author
- Natasha Hausdorff (born 1989), British barrister, news commentator, and Israel advocate
- Natasha Henstridge (born 1974), Canadian actress
- Natasha Hill (born 1981), American politician
- Natasha Hind (born 1989), New Zealand swimmer
- Natasha Hodgson (born 1986), English actress, singer, podcaster, writer and artistic director
- Natasha Holmes, physics education researcher
- Natasha Hovey (born 1967), Italian actress
- Natasha Howard (born 1991), American basketball player
- Natasha Howard (rower) (born 1980), British rower
- Natasha Hudson (born 1982), Malaysian actress
- Natasha Hunt (born 1989), English rugby player
- Natasha von Imhof (born 1970), American politician
- Natasha Irons, British politician
- Natascha Janakieva (born 1951), Bulgarian canoer
- Natasha Jiménez, Costa Rican trans and intersex activist
- Natasha Johns-Messenger (born 1970), Australian sculptor and artist
- Natasha Jonas (born 1984), British boxer
- Natasha Joubert (born 1997), South African beauty queen
- Natasha Kai (born 1983), American soccer player
- Natasha Kaiser (born 1967), American athlete
- Natascha Kampusch (born 1988), Austrian author and kidnap survivor
- Natasha Kanapé Fontaine (born 1991), Canadian poet and actress
- Natasha Salifyanji Kaoma (born 1992), Zambian medical doctor
- Natasha Kaplinsky (born 1972), English TV presenter
- Natasha Katz, American lighting designer
- Natascha Keller (born 1977), German field hockey player
- Natasha Kelley (born 1990), American artistic gymnast
- Natasha Kermani, Iranian-American screenwriter and director
- Natasha Khan (born 1979), British singer
- Natasha Khristova (born 1969), Bulgarian swimmer
- Natasha Klauss (born 1975), Colombian actress
- Natasha Kline (born 1986), American-Mexican animator, creator of Primos
- Natasha Korecki, American journalist
- Natasha Korniloff, Russian costume designer
- Natasha Korolyova (born 1973), Russian singer
- Natasha Kowalski (born 2003), German footballer
- Natasha Kroll (1914–2004), production designer
- Natasha Kuchiki (born 1976), American figure skater
- Natasha Lacy (born 1985), American basketball player
- Natasha Lako (born 1948), Albanian writer
- Natasha Law (born 1970), English artist
- Natasha Leggero (born 1974), American comedian and actress
- Natasha Lehrer, British writer and translator
- Natasha Little (born 1969), English actress
- Natasha Liu Bordizzo (born 1994), Australian actress
- Natasha Lloyd (born 1995), New Zealand swimmer
- Natasha Low (born 1993), Singaporean singer and actress
- Natasha Loring, South African actress
- Natasha Lyonne (born 1979), American actress
- Natasha Lytess (1913–1963), American acting coach

=== M-R ===
- Natasha Mack (born 1997), American basketball player
- Natasha Maclaren-Jones (born 1976), Australian politician
- Natasha Mannuela Halim (born 1994), Indonesian beauty queen
- Natasha Manor (born 1958), Israeli Russian actress
- Natasha Marcus (born 1969), American politician
- Natasha Marin, American-based artist, poet, and activist
- Natasha Marsh (born 1975), Welsh opera singer
- Natasha Mazzone (born 1979), South African politician
- Natascha McElhone (born 1969), British actress
- Natasha McKay (born 1995), Scottish figure skater
- Natasha McLean (born 1994), West Indian cricketer
- Natascha McNamara (born 1935), Australian academic, activist, and researcher
- Natasha Melnick (born 1984), American actress
- Natasha C. Merle (born 1983), American judge
- Natasha Miles (born 1988), Hong Kong cricketer
- Natasha Mitchell, Australian science journalist
- Natasha Moodie (born 1990), Jamaican swimmer
- Natasha Moraga, American-born Mexican tile artist
- Natasha Morrice (born 2000), British rower
- Natasha Morrison (born 1992), Jamaican sprinter
- Natasha Mostert, South African author and screenwriter
- Natasha Mozgovaya, American-Israeli journalist
- Natasha Negovanlis (born 1990), Canadian actress and singer
- Natasha Newsome Drennan, Irish politician
- Natasha Ngan (born 1990), British author
- Natasha Nic Gairbheith (born 1981), Irish beauty queen
- Natasha Nice (born 1988), French pornographic actress
- Natasha Nobels (born 1980), Belgian cyclist
- Natasha Noel (born 1997), Indian yoga instructor
- Natasha Noorani, Pakistani musician and ethnomusicologist
- Natasha Noy, Russian-born American computer scientist
- Natasha Ntlangwini, South African politician
- Natasha Oakley (born 1990), Australian Instagram model
- Natasha O'Brien, Irish woman attacked by an active-duty Irish soldier
- Natasha O'Keeffe (born 1986), British actor
- Natasha Olson-Thorne (born 1992), Hong Kong rugby player
- Natasha Andrea Oon (born 2001), Malaysian golfer
- Natasha Osawaru (born 1994), Nigerian politician
- Natasha Oughtred, English ballerina
- Natasha Owens (born 1976), American Christian musician
- Natasha Pace (born 1974), Maltese footballer
- Natasha Page (born 1985), British rower
- Natasha Palha (born 1994), Indian tennis player
- Natasha Paremski (born 1987), Russian-American classical pianist
- Natasha Parry (1930–2015), English actress
- Natasha Pavlovich (born 1968), Serbian-American businesswoman, actress, model and beauty pageant contestant
- Natasha Perdue (born 1975), British weightlifter
- Natasha Phillips (born 2005), British athlete
- Natasha Pincus, Australian filmmaker
- Natasha Poly (born 1985), Russian model
- Natasha Poonawalla (born 1981), Indian businesswoman
- Natasha Preston (born 1988), English novelist
- Natasha Prior (born 1998), English-born Australian soccer player
- Natasha Pulley (born 1988), British author
- Natasha Purich (born 1995), Canadian pair skater
- Natasha Pyne (born 1946), English actress
- Natasha Radojčić-Kane, American writer
- Natasha Radski, British actress
- Natasha Raikhel (born 1947), American botany professor
- Natasha Rastogi (born 1962), Indian actress
- Natasha Regan (born 1971), English chess player
- Natasha Reid (born 1981), birth name of American-South Korean singer Yoon Mi-rae
- Natasha Rhodes (born 1978), English-born author
- Natasha Richardson (1963–2009), English actress
- Natasha Rigby (born 1993), Australian soccer player
- Natasha Rosas (born 1993), Venezuelan footballer
- Natasha Rothwell (born 1980), American actress and writer
- Natasha Ryan (1984–2024), Australian person who disappeared for five years

=== S-Z ===
- Natasha Sagardia, Puerto Rican bodyboarding World Gold Medalist
- Natasha Sajé, American poet
- Natasha Salguero (born 1952), Ecuadorian writer and journalist
- Natasha Sayce-Zelem, head of technology at Sky
- Natasha Scott (born 1990), Australian lawn bowler
- Natasha Semmynova (1980–2021), Portuguese drag performer
- Natasha Sharma (born 1987), Indian actress
- Natasha Sharp, several people
- Natasha Sheybani, American Biomedical Engineer
- Natasha Shirazi (born 1996), Ugandan footballer
- Natasha Shneider (1956–2008), Russian musician
- Natasha Sinayobye, Ugandan actress
- Natasha Smith, several people
- Natasha Solomons (born 1980), British author
- Natasha Soobramanien, Mauritian author
- Natasha Spender (1919–2010), English pianist and author
- Natasha St. Louis (born 1991), Trinidad and Tobago footballer
- Natasha St-Pier (born 1981), Canadian singer
- Natasha Stagg, American author
- Natasha Staniszewski (born 1978), Canadian sports reporter
- Natasha Stefanenko (born 1969), Russian-Italian actor-model
- Natasha Stillwell, English television host and producer
- Natasha Stott Despoja (born 1969), Australian politician
- Natasha Sturges, Australian windsurfer
- Natasha Subhash (born 2001), American tennis player
- Natasha Suri (born 1989), Indian model
- Natasha Sutherland (born 1970), South African actress
- Natasha Tang (born 1992), Hong Kong distance swimmer
- Natasha Thahane (born 1995), South African actress and model
- Natasha Theremin (born 1948), Russian musician
- Natasha Thomas, several people
- Natasha Trethewey (born 1966), American poet
- Natasha Tsukanova (born 1967), Russian businesswoman
- Natasha Vargas (born 1997), Panamanian model
- Natasha Vargas-Cooper (born 1984), American journalist and author
- Natascha Viljoen (born 1970), South African business executive
- Natasha Vita-More (born 1950), American artist and trans humanist
- Natasha Vlassenko (born 1956), Russian-Australian pianist
- Natasha Walter (born 1967), British feminist writer
- Natasha Wanganeen (born 1984), Australian actress
- Natasha Watcham-Roy (born 1992), Canadian rugby player
- Natasha Watley (born 1981), American softball player
- Natasha Wheat (born 1981), American artist
- Natasha Wightman (born 1973), British actress
- Natasha Williams (born 1971), British actress
- Natasha Wilson, New Zealand opera singer
- Natasha Wimmer (born 1973), American translator
- Natascha Wingelaar (born 1974), Dutch politician
- Natasha Wodak (born 1981), Canadian long-distance runner
- Natasha Wong (born 1967), New Zealand former rugby player
- Natasha Yarovenko (born 1979), Ukrainian-born actress
- Natasha Zinko, Ukrainian artist
- Natasha Zouves (born 1989), American journalist
- Natasha Zvereva (born 1971), Belarusian tennis player

== Fictional characters ==
- Natasha, a baby Muppet in the PBS children's television series Sesame Street
- Commander Natasha, a character in Raj Comics
- Natasha Andersen, a character in the British soap opera Hollyoaks
- Natasha Blakeman, a character in the ITV soap opera Coronation Street
- Alexis Davis (General Hospital) (born Natasha Cassadine), a character in the ABC soap opera General Hospital
- Natasha Fatale, a character in the 1960s animated television series The Adventures of Rocky and Bullwinkle and Friends
- Natasha Romanoff, also known as Black Widow, a character from Marvel Comics
- Natasha Rostova, a character in the novel War and Peace by Leo Tolstoy
- Tasha Yar, a character in the sci-fi television series Star Trek: The Next Generation
- Tasha, a Greyhawk wizard in the roleplaying game Dungeons & Dragons

== Notable animals ==
- Natasha (monkey), a macaque at the Safary Park zoo near Tel Aviv, Israel

== See also ==
- Natacha (given name)
- Nataša, given name
- Tasha, given name
- Latasha, given name
