= Tasha =

Tasha is a primarily English-language feminine given name of Slavic origin, a shortening of Natasha, which means 'Christmas Day'. Notable people with the given name include:

- Tasha Alexander (born 1969), American author
- Tasha Baxter (born 1981), South African singer-songwriter
- Tasha Beeds, Canadian academic and professor
- Tasha Biltmore, American actress, playwright and director
- Tasha Boerner (born 1973), American politician
- Tasha Butts (1982–2023), American basketball player
- Tasha Danvers (born 1977), British athlete
- Tasha de Vasconcelos (born 1996), Mozambican-born Portuguese-Canadian model, actress and humanitarian ambassador
- Tasha Holiday (born 1977/78), American singer
- Tasha Hubbard (born 1973), Canadian filmmaker and educator
- Tasha Humphrey (born 1985), American basketball player
- Tasha Inniss, American mathematician and educator
- Tasha Kheiriddin (born 1970), Canadian public affairs commentator, consultant, lawyer, political analyst and writer
- Tasha Layton (born 1982), American Christian singer, songwriter and author
- Tasha Cobbs Leonard (born 1981), American gospel musician and songwriter
- Tasha Low (born 1993), Singaporean actress and singer
- Tasha Marbury (born 1976), American reality show personality
- Tasha Nelson (born 1974), American alpine skier
- Tasha Nykyforak (born 1982), Australian netball player
- Tasha Page-Lockhart (born 1983), American Christian artist and musician
- Tasha Pointer (born 1979), American basketball coach and player
- Tasha Reign (born 1989), American pornographic actress, nude model, producer and sex columnist
- Tasha the Amazon (real name Tasha Schumann), Canadian rapper, singer-songwriter, hip hop producer, author and YouTuber
- Tasha Schwikert (born 1984), American gymnast
- Tasha Scott, American actress and singer
- Tasha Smith (born 1971), American actress
- Tasha Spillett-Sumner, Canadian author and educator
- Tasha Sounart, American animator, artist, video game designer and writer
- Tasha Steelz (born 1988), American professional wrestler
- Tasha St. Louis (born 1983), Trinidadian footballer
- Tasha Suri, British author and academic librarian
- Tasha Taylor, American vocalist, songwriter and actress
- Tasha Thomas (c. 1945–1984), American singer and actress
- Tasha Tilberg (born 1979), Canadian fashion model
- Tasha Tudor (1915–2008), American illustrator and writer
- Tasha (musician) (real name Tasha Viets-VanLear), American musician
- Tasha Williams (athlete) (born 1973), New Zealand hammer thrower

== Fictional ==
- Tasha Andrews, Home and Away character
- Tasha Yar, Star Trek: The Next Generation character
- Tasha, a character from The Backyardigans

== See also ==
- Tasha-Nicole Terani, Iranian-born American soccer trainer and ball control expert
- Latasha, a given name of similar origin
- Tesha (given name)
