= Syed Sajid Mehdi =

Pakistani politician

- سید ساجد مہدی

Member of the National Assembly of Pakistan
- Incumbent
- Assumed office 29 February 2024
- Constituency: NA-157 Vehari-II
- In office 13 August 2018 – 10 August 2023
- Constituency: NA-163 (Vehari-II)
- In office 1 June 2013 – 31 May 2018
- Constituency: NA-168 (Vehari-II)

Personal details
- Born: June 18, 1948 (age 78)
- Party: PMLN (2013-present)
- Other political affiliations: PML(Q) (2001-2013)

Syed Sajid Mehdi (Urdu: سید ساجد مہدی; born 18 June 1948) is a Pakistani politician who has been a member of the National Assembly of Pakistan since February 2024 and previously served in this position from August 2018 till August 2023, and from June 2013 to May 2018.

== Early life ==
He was born on 18 June 1948.

== Political career ==
He ran for the seat of the National Assembly of Pakistan as a candidate off Pakistan Muslim League (Q) (PML-Q) from Constituency NA-167 (Vehari-I) in the 2008 Pakistani general election but was unsuccessful. He received 38,383 votes and lost the seat to Chaudhry Nazeer Ahmad. In the same election, he also ran for the seat of the National Assembly as an indedpent candidate Constituency NA-168 (Vehari-II) but was unsuccessful. He received 708 votes and lost the seat to Azeem Daultana.

He was elected to the National Assembly as a candidate of Pakistan Muslim League (N) (PML-N) from Constituency NA-168 (Vehari-II) in the 2013 Pakistani general election. He received 69,049 votes and defeated Ishaq Khan Khakwani, a candidate of Pakistan Tehreek-e-Insaf (PTI). During his tenure as Member of the National Assembly, he served as Federal Parliamentary Secretary for Housing and Works.

He was re-elected to the National Assembly as a candidate of PML-N from Constituency NA-163 (Vehari-II) in the 2018 Pakistani general election He received votes and defeated Ishaq Khan Khakwani, a candidate of PTI.

He was re-elected to the National Assembly as a candidate of PML-N from NA-157 Vehari-II in the 2024 Pakistani general election. He received 99,615 votes and defeated Sabeen Safdar, an Independent politician candidate supported by PTI.
