= Nataliya =

Nataliya (Ukrainian: Наталія, Russian: Наталия) is the Ukrainian and Russian form of the female given name Natalia. A diminutive form is Ukrainian: Наталка, romanized: Natalka (see: Natalka Poltavka), and Russian: Наташа, romanized: Natasha.

== People with the given name Nataliya ==
- Nataliya Aleksandrova (born 1984), Belarusian rhythmic gymnast
- Nataliya Berkut (born 1975), Ukrainian long-distance runner
- Nataliya Borysenko (born 1975), Ukrainian team handball player
- Nataliya Burdeyna (born 1974), Ukrainian archer
- Nataliya Dmytruk (born 1957), former sign language interpreter on the Ukrainian state-run channel UT1 news broadcasts
- Nataliya Dobrynska (born 1982), Ukrainian heptathlete
- Nataliya Donchenko (1932–2022), Soviet speed skater
- Nataliya Gotsiy (born 1985), Ukrainian fashion model
- Nataliya Semenivna Karpa, professionally known as Natalka Karpa (born 1981), Ukrainian singer
- Nataliya Kuznetsova (born 1991), Russian professional bodybuilder and powerlifter
- Nataliya Lyapina (born 1976), Ukrainian team handball player
- Nataliya Matryuk (born 1959), Ukrainian former handball player
- Nataliya Medvedeva (1958–2003), Russian singer, poet and writer
- Nataliya Misyulya (born 1966), retired female race walker from Belarus
- Nataliya Pohrebnyak (born 1988), Ukrainian track and field sprint athlete
- Nataliya Pyhyda (born 1981), Ukrainian track and field sprint athlete
- Nataliya Rusnachenko (born 1969), Ukrainian former handball player
- Nataliya Skakun (born 1981), Ukrainian weightlifter and Olympic gold medallist
- Nataliya Tobias (born 1980), Ukrainian middle-distance runner who specializes in the 1500 metres
- Nataliya Tymoshkina (born 1952), former Soviet/Ukrainian handball player
- Nataliya Vitrenko (born 1951), Ukrainian politician and scientist
- Nataliya Yermolovich (born 1964), retired female javelin thrower
- Nataliya Zinchenko (born 1979), Ukrainian football player
- Nataliya Zolotukhina (born 1985), Ukrainian hammer thrower
- Nataliya Petrivna Zubytska, née Yushchenko (born 1942), Ukrainian herbalist and healer

== See also ==
- Natalya, female given name
- Natalija, female given name
- Natalia, female given name
