= Ayesha Nazir Jutt =

Pakistani politician

- عائشہ نذیر جٹ

Member of the National Assembly of Pakistan
- Incumbent
- Assumed office 29 February 2024
- Constituency: NA-156 Vehari-I

Personal details
- Party: PTI (2024-present)

Ayesha Nazir Jutt (Urdu: عائشہ نذیر جٹ) is a Pakistani politician who has been a member of the National Assembly of Pakistan since February 2024.

== Political career ==
She contested the 2013 Pakistani general election for the seat of the National Assembly of Pakistan from NA-167 (Vehari-I) as an independent candidate, but was unsuccessful. She received 43,703 votes and was defeated by Chaudhry Nazeer Ahmad, a candidate of Pakistan Muslim League (N) (PML-N).

She contested the 2018 Pakistani general election for the seat of the National Assembly from NA-162 Vehari-I as an independent candidate, but was unsuccessful. She received 64,766 votes and was defeated by Choudhry Faqir Ahmad, a candidate of PML-N.

She was elected to the National Assembly in the 2024 Pakistani general election from NA-156 Vehari-I as Pakistan Tehreek-e-Insaf (PTI) backed-independent candidate. She received 119,758 votes while the runner-up, Chaudhry Nazeer Ahmad of PML-N, received 90,065 votes.
