= NA-157 Vehari-II =

Constituency of the National Assembly of Pakistan

- Constituency for the National Assembly of Pakistan
- Region: Burewala Tehsil (partly) and Vehari Tehsil (partly) of Vehari District
- Electorate: 462,514

Current constituency
- Party: Pakistan Muslim League (N)
- Member: Syed Sajid Mehdi
- Created from: NA-168 Vehari-II

NA-157 Vehari-II (این اے-157، وِہاڑى-2) is a constituency for the National Assembly of Pakistan.

== Election 2002 ==
General elections were held on 10 October 2002. Ishaq Khan Khakwani of PML-Q won by 61,849 votes.

General election 2002: NA-168 Vehari-II
Party	Candidate	Votes	%	±%
PML(Q)	Ishaq Khan Khakwani	61,849	43.84	
PPP	Shahida Daultana	47,841	33.91	
PML(N)	Tehmina Daultana	31,382	22.25	
Turnout		144,845	52.26	
Total valid votes		141,072	97.40	
Rejected ballots		3,773	2.60	
Majority		14,008	9.93	
Registered electors		277,169		

== Election 2008 ==
General elections were held on 18 February 2008. Azeem Daultana of PPP won by 49,299 votes.

General election 2008: NA-168 Vehari-II
Party	Candidate	Votes	%	±%
PPP	Azeem Daultana	49,299	33.01	
PML(Q)	Ishaq Khan Khakwani	47,898	32.07	
PML(N)	Tehmina Daultana	26,254	17.58	
Independent	Bilal Akbar Bhatti	24,192	16.20	
Others	Others (five candidates)	1,705	1.14	
Turnout		153,885	49.10	
Total valid votes		149,348	97.05	
Rejected ballots		4,537	2.95	
Majority		1,401	0.94	
Registered electors		313,416		
PPP gain from PML(Q)				

== By-election 2012 ==
A by-election was held on 25 February 2012 due to the death of Azeem Daultana, the precious member from this seat. Natasha Daultana, his sister, won the election with votes.

By-election 2012: NA-168 Vehari-II
Party	Candidate	Votes	%	±%
PPP	Natasha Daultana	70,146	58.15	▲35.14
PML(N)	Bilal Akbar Bhatti	46,328	38.41	▲20.83
Independent	Hafiz Muhammad Iqbal Kharal	2,976	2.47	
Others	Others (five candidates)	1,176	0.97	
Turnout		122,086	47.28	▼1.82
Total valid votes		120,626	98.80	
Rejected ballots		1,460	1.20	
Majority		23,818	19.75	▲18.81
Registered electors		258,233		
PPP hold				

== Election 2013 ==
General elections were held on 11 May 2013. Syed Sajid Mehdi of PML-N won by 69,049 votes and became the member of National Assembly.

General election 2013: NA-168 Vehari-II
Party	Candidate	Votes	%	±%
PML(N)	Syed Sajid Mehdi	69,049	36.76	
PTI	Ishaq Khan Khakwani	54,334	28.92	
PPP	Natasha Daultana	42,292	22.51	
Independent	Arifa Nazir	17,445	9.29	
Others	Others (nine candidates)	4,729	2.52	
Turnout		193,783	61.94	
Total valid votes		187,849	96.94	
Rejected ballots		5,934	3.06	
Majority		14,715	7.84	
Registered electors		312,836		
PML(N) gain from PPP				

== Election 2018 ==
General elections are scheduled to be held on 25 July 2018.

General election 2018: NA-163 Vehari-II
Party	Candidate	Votes	%	±%
PML(N)	Syed Sajid Mehdi	70,344	33.16	
PTI	Ishaq Khan Khakwani	56,977	26.86	
Independent	Arifa Nazir	29,254	13.79	
PPP	Natasha Daultana	27,726	13.07	
TLP	Syed Muhammad Ismail Shah	15,491	7.30	
PHP	Ghulam Murtaza	5,087	2.40	
Pakistan Kissan Ittehad (Ch.Anwar)	Muhammad Anwar	4,663	2.20	
Independent	Muhammad Javed Khan	1,584	0.75	
Independent	Muhammad Akram	983	0.46	
Turnout		218,617	57.99	
Total valid votes		212,109	97.02	
Rejected ballots		6,508	2.98	
Majority		13,367	6.30	
Registered electors		377,502		

== Election 2024 ==
General elections were held on 8 February 2024. Syed Sajid Mehdi won the election with 99,615 votes.

General election 2024: NA-157 Vehari-II
Party	Candidate	Votes	%	±%
PML(N)	Syed Sajid Mehdi	99,615	40.14	▲6.98
PTI	Sabeen Safdar (Note: Filed nomination papers as PTI candidate but ECP allowed her to run as an Independent)	80,187	32.31	▲5.45
Independent	Bilal Akbar Bhatti	31,386	12.65	
TLP	Muhammad Ali Langrial	24,954	10.05	▲2.75
Others	Others (eleven candidates)	12,045	4.85	
Turnout		255,169	55.17	▼2.82
Total valid votes		248,187	97.26	
Rejected ballots		6,982	2.74	
Majority		19,428	7.83	▲1.53
Registered electors		462,514		

== See also ==
- NA-156 Vehari-I
- NA-158 Vehari-III
