= Latasha =

Latasha, LaTasha or La Tasha is a feminine given name, an English-language variant of Slavic Natasha, meaning 'Christmas Day'. It is often found among African Americans. Notable people with the given name include:

- Latashá (real name Latasha Alcindor, born 1988), American rapper and producer
- Latasha Byears (born 1973), American basketball player
- LaTasha Colander (born 1976), American track and field sprinter
- Tasha Steelz (real name Latasha Harris; born 1988), American professional wrestler
- LaTasha Jenkins (born 1977), American track and field sprinter
- Latasha Khan (born 1973), American squash player
- Latasha Lattimore (born 2003), Canadian basketball player
- Tasha Marbury (real name LaTasha Marbury; born 1976), American reality show personality
- Latasha Ngwube (born 1983), Nigerian journalist, media personality and advocate
- MC Trouble (real name LaTasha Rogers; 1970–1991), American rapper
- Tasha Taylor (real name La Tasha Taylor), American vocalist, songwriter and actress
- Latasha Thomas (born 1965), American politician

== See also ==
- Killing of Latasha Harlins, the shooting of an African American girl
- Tasha, a given name of similar origin
