= Nataša Novotná =

Czech dancer, choreographer and lecturer

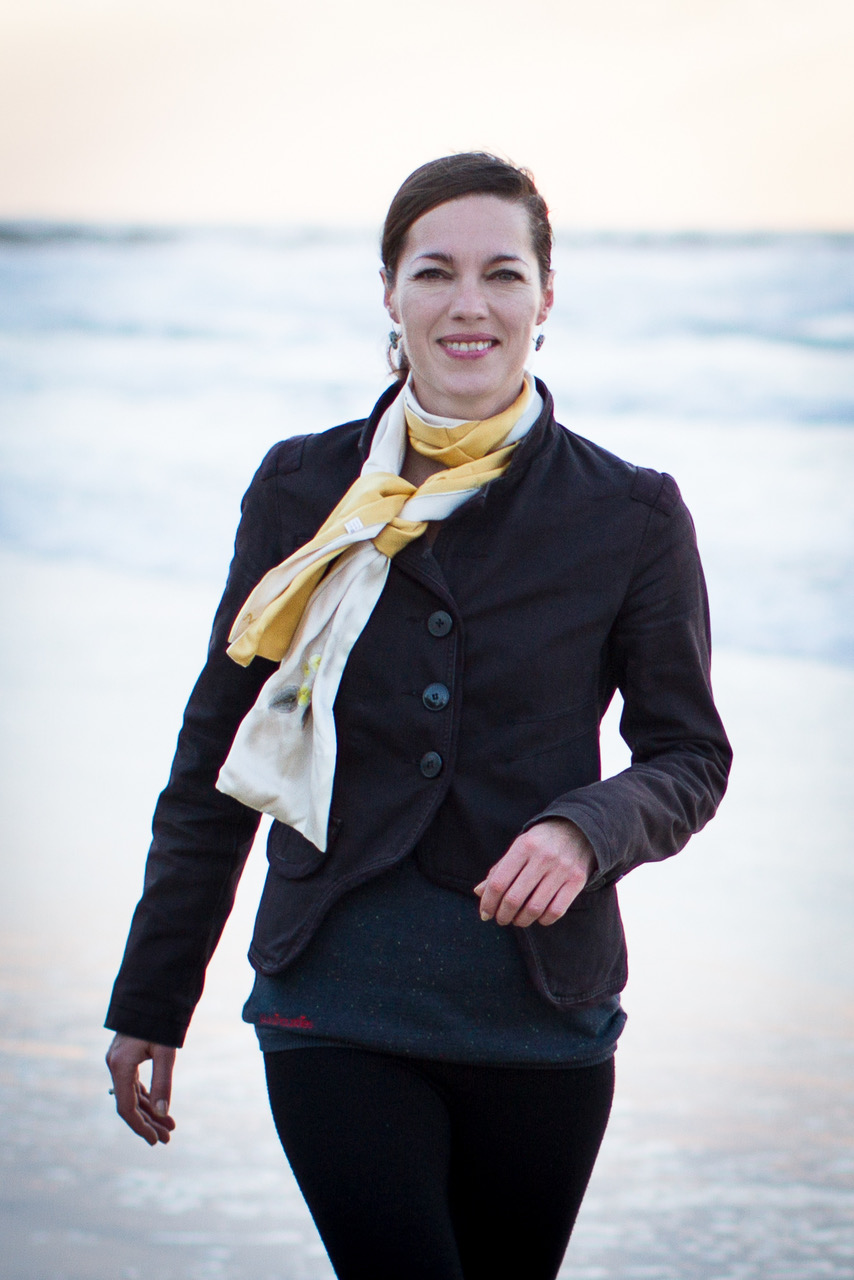
- Born: 29 October 1977; Opava, Czechoslovakia
- Occupations: dancer, choreographer
- Known for: certified lecturer of Gaga movement language

Nataša Novotná (born 29 October 1977 in Opava) is a Czech dancer, choreographer, lecturer, co-founder of 420PEOPLE and founder of Kylián fund in Prague.

== Education ==
She graduated from Janáček Conservatory in Ostrava.

== Professional career ==
=== Dancer and choreographer ===
In 1997 she was engaged in the Dutch ensemble Nederlands Dans Theater 2 (NDT2) led by Jiří Kylián. Between 2000 and 2002 she danced in the Swedish Göteborgs Operan Ballet and since 2002 she has been a member of the Nederlands Dans Theater (NDT1). She has collaborated with choreographers, e.g. J. Kylián, O. Naharin, W. Forsyth, M. Ek, Crystal Pite, Meryl Tancard and others. Since 2007, she has been working independently, performing contemporary dance, collaborating as a dancer with leading world scenes and choreographers such as the Tero Saarinen Company in Finland, Copenhagen International Ballet, Korzo Theater, Station Zuid and C-scope in the Netherlands, as well with Roberto Bolle, the soloist of the Teatro alla Scala or with the London's Sadler's Wells and Sylvie Guillem.

=== 420PEOPLE ===
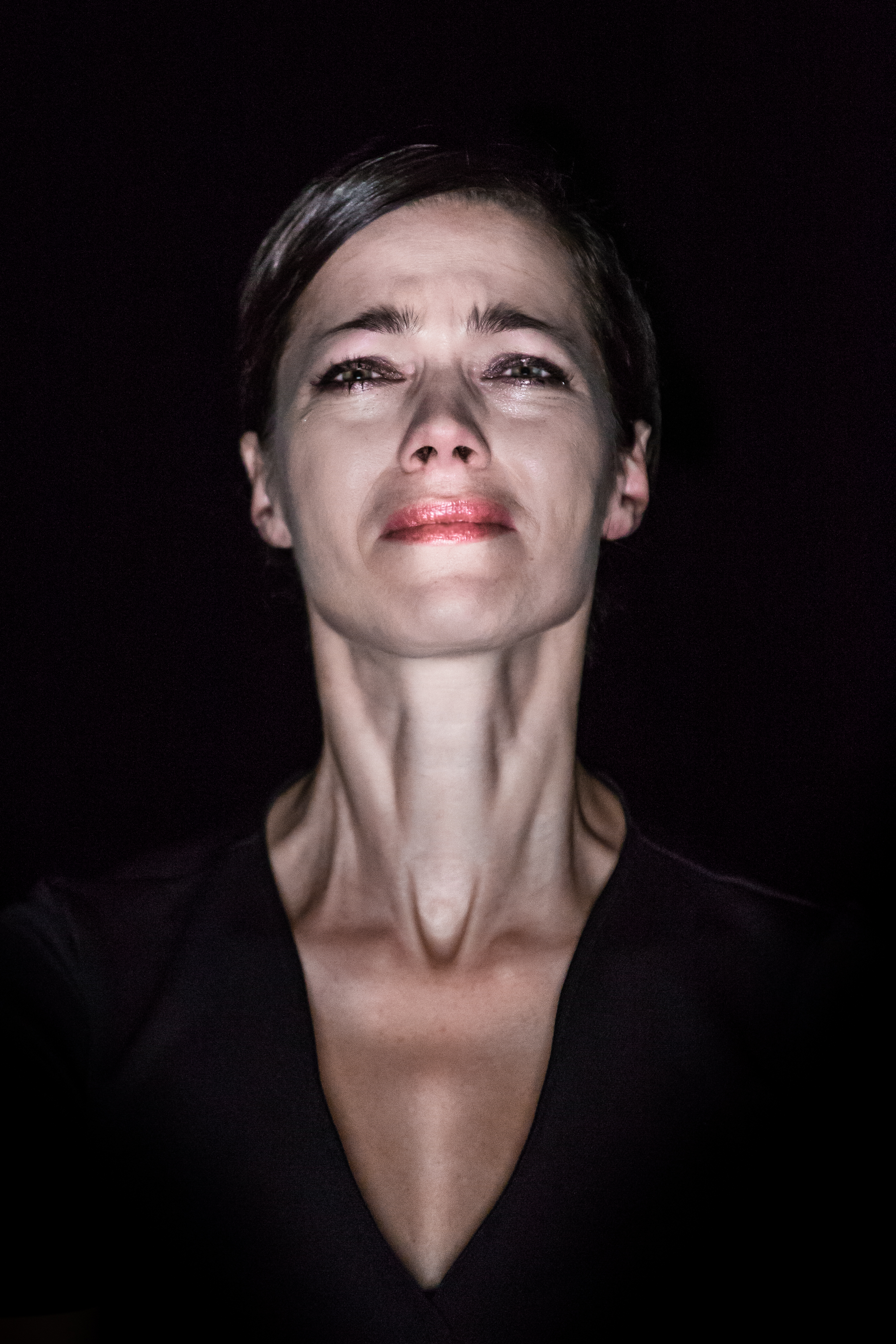
Phrasing the Pain (Nataša Novotná, 2014), choreografie: Ann van der Broek, foto Pavel Hejný

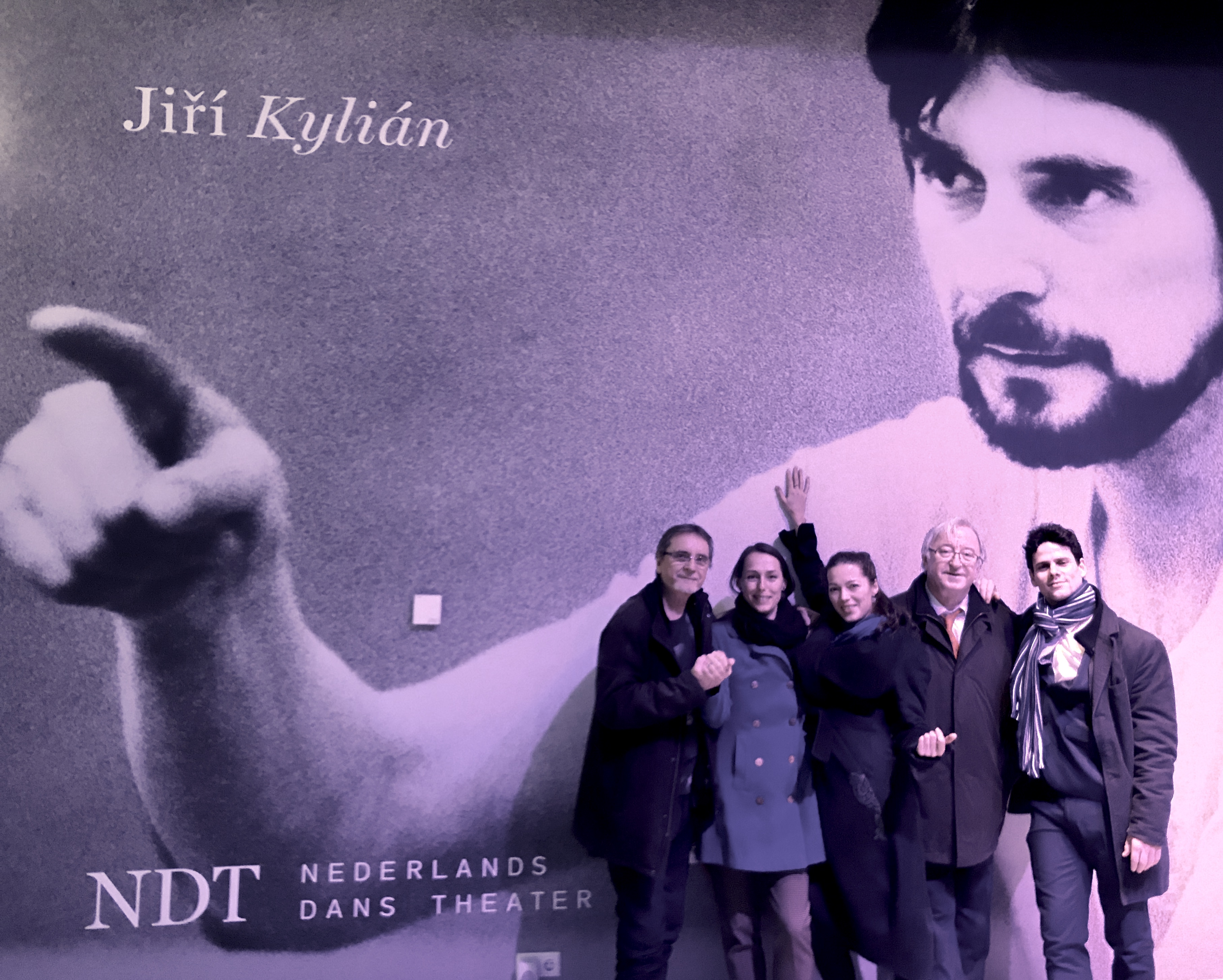
Celebrating Kylian, Den Haag 2017 (zleva: Jiří Kylián, Markéta Perroud, Nataša Novotná, Jiří Lábus, Ondřej Vinklát)

Together with her former NDT colleague Václav Kuneš and manager Ondřej Kotrč, in 2007 she founded a contemporary dance ensemble 420PEOPLE, and acted as executive director of the ensemble until 2016. The name of the ensemble evokes Czech origin – 420 is the international telephone prefix for the Czech Republic.

The ensemble performs regularly both abroad (e.g. France, Spain, Germany, Mexico, Holland, Finland, Norway, Japan, Great Britain, etc.) and on the Czech stages (among others National Theater, National Moravian-Silesian Theatre).

The ensemble organizes the participation of prominent foreign artists at events in the Czech Republic – such as Ohad Naharin, Abou Lagraa, Jo Strǿmgren, Ann Van den Broek, Sidi Larbi Cherkaoui and others.

=== Kylián Fund in Prague ===
After a decade of working for 420PEOPLE, she founded the Kylián Fund in Prague in 2017. Its purpose is to support the art of dance and dance-related disciplines in an international context.

== Further activities ==
She is involved in initiatives to support Czech contemporary dance and is a board member of the Vision of Dance professional organization.

She teaches at dance conservatories, Academy of Performing Arts in Prague and in ensembles in the Czech Republic and abroad. She is a lecturer in the Dance Studio of the New Stage of the National Theatre in Prague, which offers both contemporary and classical dance lessons. Since 2017 she has been certified teacher of the Gaga movement language, developed by world-renowned choreographer Ohad Naharin.

== Selected awards ==
- 2003 nominated by Dutch critics for Best Dancer for interpretation of Pneuma choreography by J. Inger (Dance Europe)
- 2004 nominated by Dutch critics for Best Dancer for the interpretation of W. Forsyth's Duo choreography (Dance Europe)
- 2008 Thalia Award (for dance performance in Small Hour choreography)
- 2009 Dancer of the Year (at the DANCE PRAGUE FESTIVAL)

== Selected choreography ==
- 2007 Znaky o znacích (created for Janáček Conservatory in Ostrava)
- 2010 Sacrebleu (created for 420PEOPLE)
- 2012 Pták Ohnivák (created for ballet ND Brno)
- 2012 Rezonance na pěší vzdálenost project with Berg Orchestra
- 2013 Škrtič (created for National Moravian-Silesian Theatre in Ostrava)
- 2017 Portrait Parlé (created for 420PEOPLE)
- 2017 Daniel Špinar, 420PEOPLE: Křehkosti, tvé jméno je žena, directed by Daniel Špinar, New Stage of the National Theatre in Prague
- 2018 "Dream On" (created for Janáček Conservatory in Ostrava)

== Filmography ==
- 2013 Hamletophelia (dance fashion film), dir. by Jakub Jahn
- 2016 Personal Shopper (mystery film), role: Ghost, dir. by Olivier Assayas
- 2017 Closed (dance film), directed by Stein-Roger Bull, Jo Strǿmgren

== Gallery ==
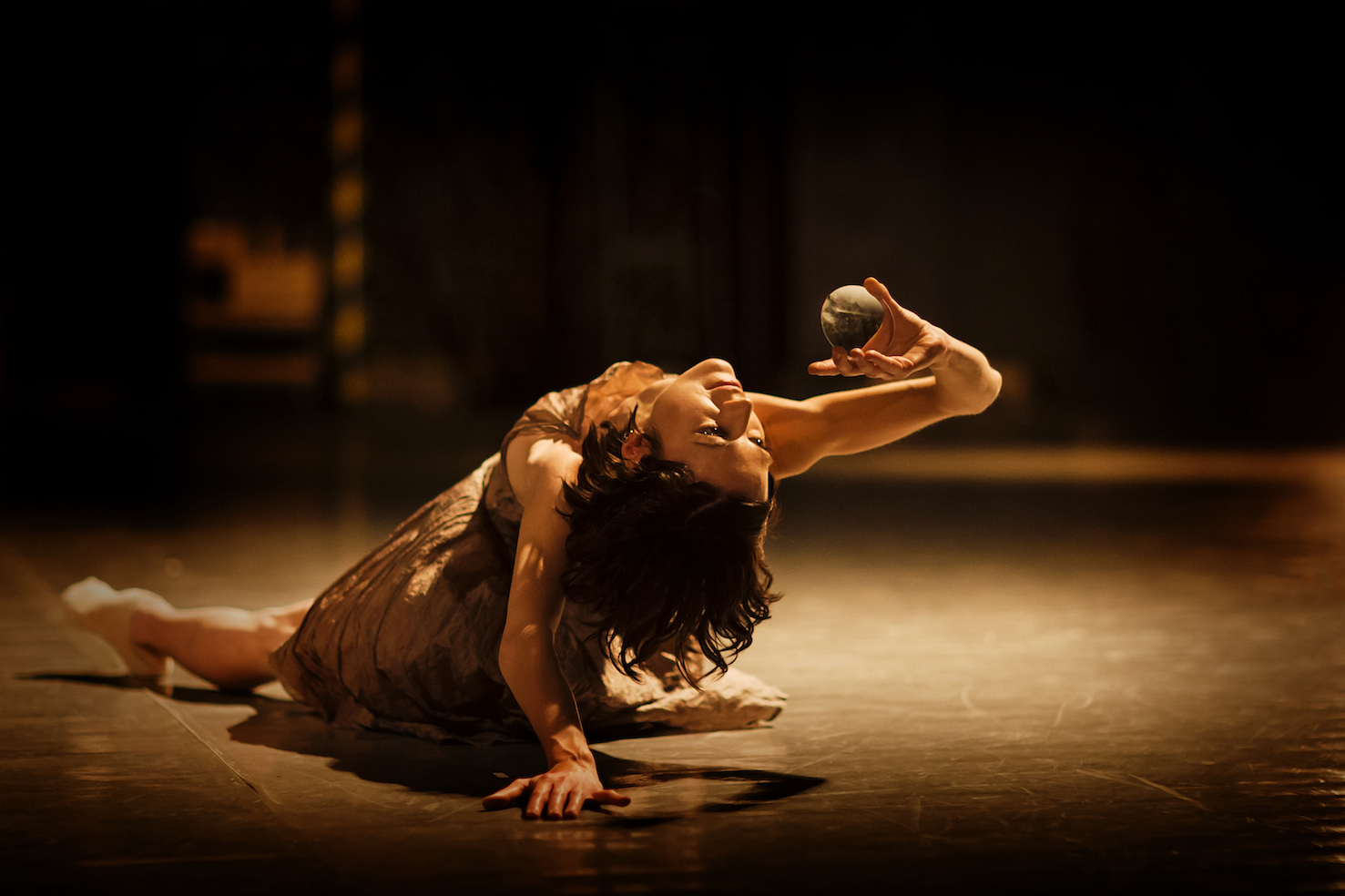
Sacrebleu (Nataša Novotná, 2012), photo Tamara Černá SofiG

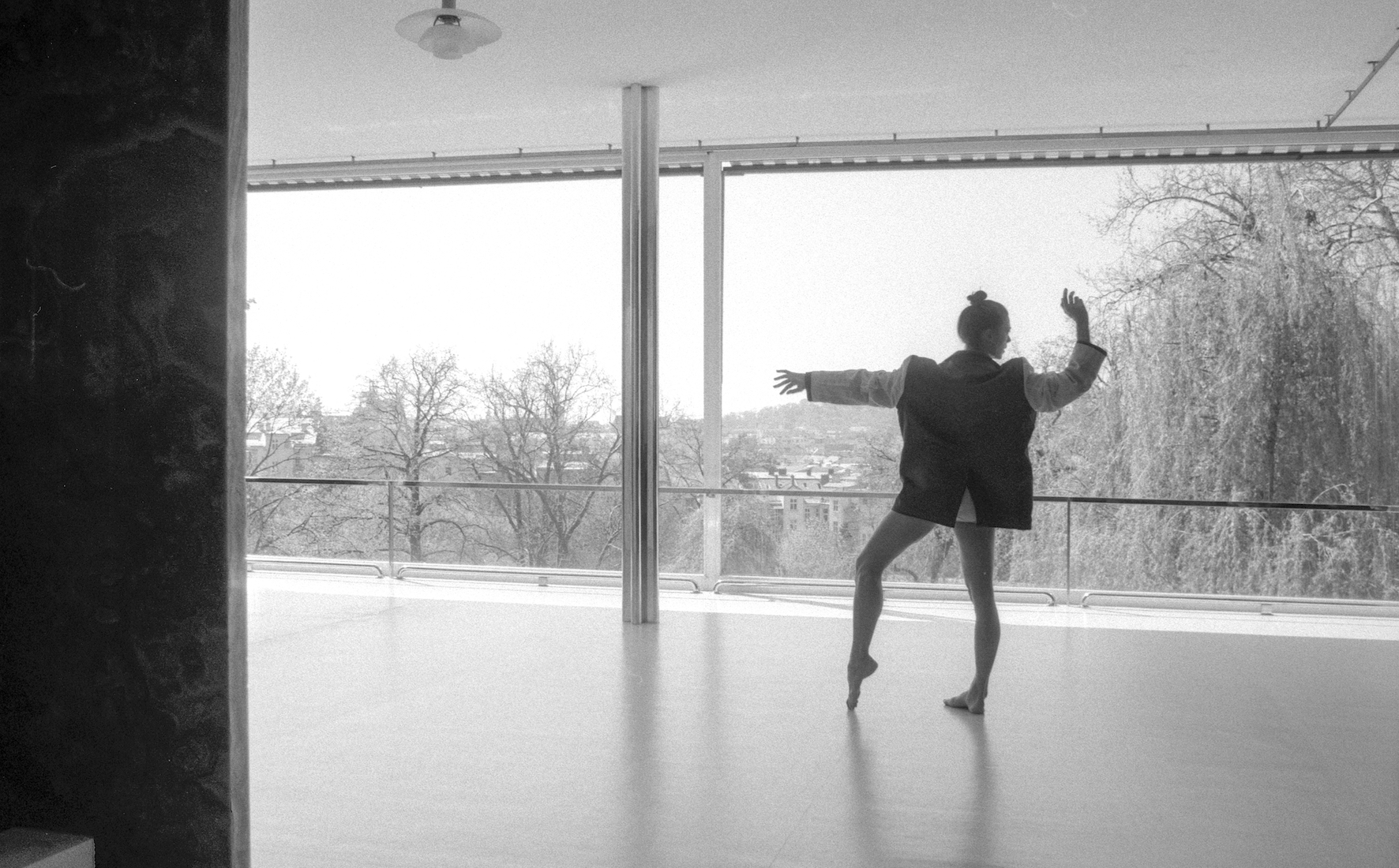
Nataša Novotná (Vila Tugendhat, Brno, 2017)
