= Natasha Daultana =

Pakistani politician

Member of the National Assembly of Pakistan
- In office February 2024 – November 2024
- Constituency: Reserved seat for women
- In office February 2008 – February 2013
- Constituency: NA-168 (Vehari-II)

Personal details
- Other party: PPP (2008-2024)
- Relatives: See Daultana family

Natasha Daultana is an incumbent member of the National Assembly of Pakistan since February 2024. She is a Pakistani politician who had been a member of the National Assembly of Pakistan from February 2008 to 2013.

== Political career ==
She was elected to the National Assembly of Pakistan from Constituency NA-168 (Vehari-II) as a candidate of Pakistan Peoples Party (PPP) in by-polls held in 2012. She received 70,551 votes and defeated Bilal Akbar Bhatti.

She ran for the seat of the National Assembly from Constituency NA-168 (Vehari-II) as a candidate of PPP in the 2013 Pakistani general election, but was unsuccessful. She received 42,292 votes and lost the seat to Syed Sajid Mehdi.

On 13 May 2024, the Election Commission of Pakistan (ECP) suspended her membership as a member of the National Assembly. This action followed a Supreme Court of Pakistan decision to suspend the verdict of the Peshawar High Court, which had denied the allocation of a reserved seat to the PTI-Sunni Ittehad Council bloc.
