= Nataša =

Nataša (Cyrillic: Наташа; Serbo-Croatian pronunciation: [nǎtaʃa]; Macedonian pronunciation: [na'taʃa]) is a feminine given name found in West and South Slavic languages, cognate to East Slavic Natasha.

Notable people with the name include:

- Nataša Andonova (born 1993), Macedonian football player
- Nataša Bajin-Šljepica (born 1945), Serbian gymnast
- Nataša Bekvalac (born 1980), Serbian singer
- Nataša Bojković (born 1971), Serbian chess player
- Nataša Bokal (1967–2026), Slovenian skier
- Nataša Dorčić (born 1968), Croatian actress
- Nataša Dušev-Janić (born 1982), Serbian-Hungarian canoer
- Nataša Erjavec (born 1968), Slovenian athlete
- Nataša Gollová (1912–1988), Czech actress
- Nataša Janjić (born 1981), Croatian actress
- Nataša Jonoska (born 1961), Macedonian mathematician
- Nataša Kandić (born 1946), Serbian human rights activist
- Nataša Kejžar (born 1976), Slovenian swimmer
- Nataša Kolega (born 1966), Croatian handball player
- Nataša Krsmanović (born 1985), Serbian volleyball player
- Nataša Meškovska (born 1972), Macedonian swimmer
- Nataša Mićić (born 1965), Serbian lawyer and politician
- Nataša Ninković (born 1972), Serbian actress
- Nataša Novotná (born 1977), Czech dancer and choreographer
- Nataša Osmokrović (born 1976), Croatian volleyball player
- Nataša Petrović (born 1988), Macedonian actress of Serbian descent
- Nataša Pavlović, Serbian mathematician
- Nataša Pirc Musar (born 1968), Slovenian attorney, author and politician
- Nataša Tapušković (born 1975), Serbian actress
- Nataša Urbančič (1945–2011), Slovenian athlete
- Nataša Vezmar (born 1976), Croatian taekwondo practitioner
- Nataša Vojnović (born 1979), Bosnian Serb model
- Nataša Vučković (born 1967), Serbian politician

== See also ==
- Natalija
