= Krekhaiv =

Human settlement in Chernihiv Oblast, Ukraine

Krekhaiv Крехаїв
- Village
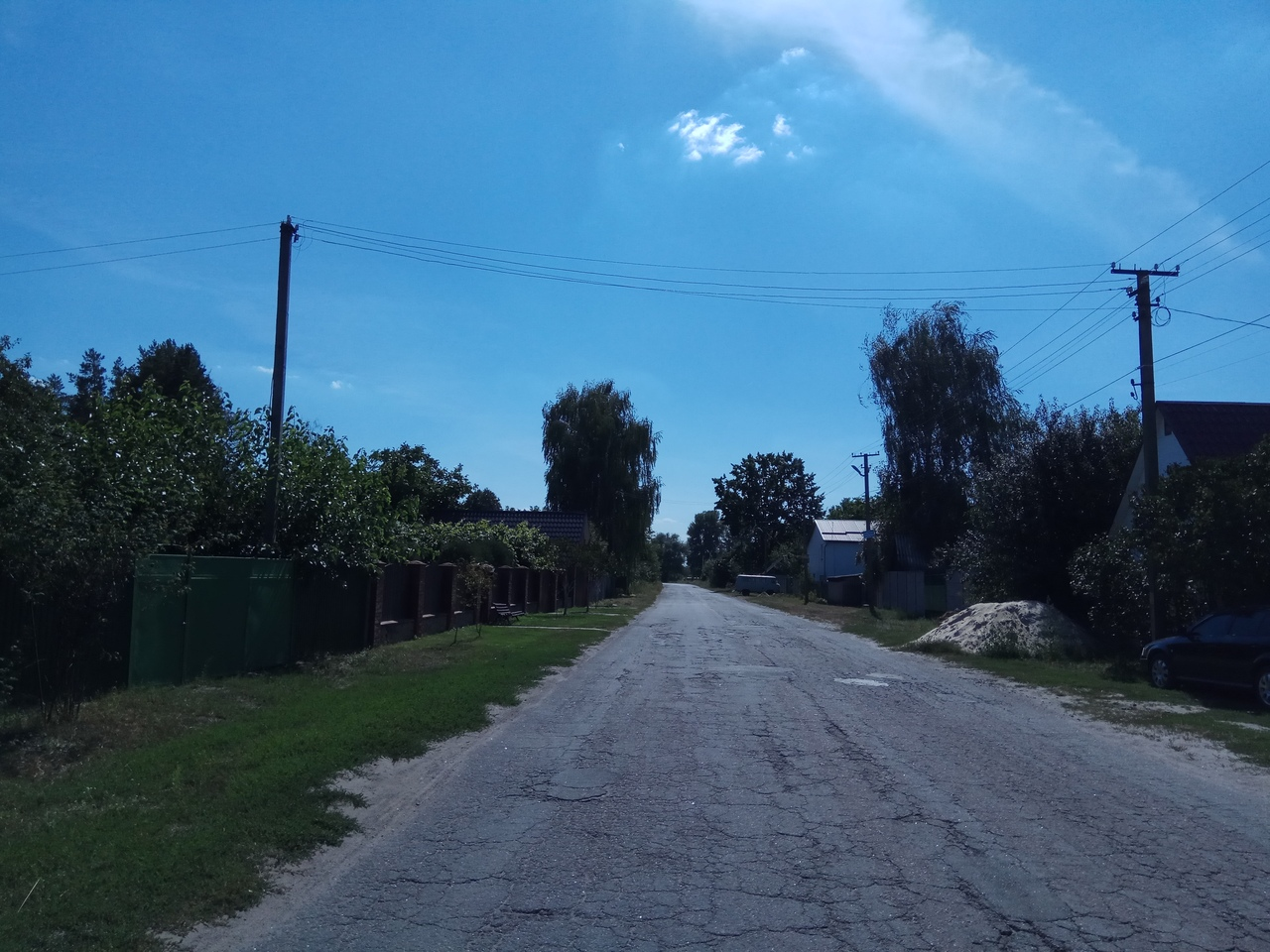

- Location within Ukraine
- Coordinates: 47°41′4″N 33°16′22″E
- Country: Ukraine
- Oblast: Chernihiv Oblast
- Raion: Chernihiv Raion
- Established: 1480

Area
  - Total: 53.35 km^{2} (20.60 sq mi)

Population (2014)
  - Total: 495
  - Density: 9.28/km^{2} (24.0/sq mi)

Krekhaiv (Ukrainian: Крехаїв) is a village in Ukraine, in Chernihiv Raion, Chernihiv Oblast, of Ukraine, located roughly 85 km south of Chernihiv and 30 km north of Kyiv. Until 2020, the local government body was the Krekhaiv Village Council. The village is a part of the Oster urban hromada. The village's population is 418 people.

During the Holodomor at least 371 of the villages residents perished.

== Geography ==
The village is located on the left bank of the Lyubich River, a tributary of the Desna.

== Population ==
The population's native language according to the 2001 Ukrainian census.

Native languages in Krekhaiv
Languages	percent
Ukrainian	98.23%
Russian	1.77%

== Notable residents ==
Natalya Zemna, Ukrainian herbalist born here.
