= Move (TV series) =

- Genre: Documentary
- Directed by: Thierry Demaizière; Alban Teurlai
- Starring: Jon Boogz; Lil Buck; Israel Galván
- Country of origin: United States
- Original language: English
- No. of seasons: 1
- No. of episodes: 5

Production
- Running time: 47–59 minutes

Original release
- Network: Netflix
- Release: October 23, 2020

Move is a 2020 Netflix docuseries starring Jon Boogz, Lil Buck and Israel Galván directed by French documentary filmmakers Thierry Demaizière and Alban Teurlai.

== Cast ==
- Jon Boogz
- Lil Buck
- Israel Galván
- Akram Khan
- Ohad Naharin
- Kimiko Versatile

Theatre and dance scholar Octavian Saiu, who hosted dialogues with three of the artists featured in the series, praised the programme for “disseminating information about contemporary dance to a wide audience”.

== Episodes ==
No.	Title	Original release date
1	"Featuring Jon Boogz and Lil Buck"	October 23, 2020
2	"Featuring Ohad Naharin"	October 23, 2020
3	"Featuring Israel Galván"	October 23, 2020
4	"Featuring Kimiko Versatile"	October 23, 2020
5	"Featuring Akram Khan"	October 23, 2020

== Release ==
Move was released on October 23, 2020, on Netflix.
