= Tesha (given name) =

Tesha is a feminine given name.

== List of people with the given name ==
- Tesha Buss, American politician
- Tesha Price (born 1994), American wrestler
- Tesha Zohidov (1906–1981), Soviet-Uzbek zoologist

== See also ==
- Tesha BaErev
- Tasha
