= Natalya =

Natalya (Russian: Наталья) is the Russian form of the female given name Natalia.

The name Natasha (Russian: Наташа), being originally a diminutive form of Natalya, became an independent name outside the Russian-speaking states since the late 1800s.

== People with the given name Natalya ==
- Natalya Akhrimenko (born 1955), Russian shot putter
- Natalya Donchenko (1932–2022), Soviet speed skater
- Natalya Estemirova (1958–2009), Russian human rights activist
- Natalya German (born 1963), Soviet sprint athlete
- Natalya Gorbanevskaya (1936–2013), Russian poet, translator and civil rights activist
- Natalya Marchenkova (born 1948), Ukrainian animator and animation director.
- Natalya Kaptelinina (born 1984), Russian politician
- Natalya Kushch-Mazuryk, née Kushch (born 1983), Ukrainian pole vaulter
- Natalya Melik Melikyan (1906–1989), Armenian scientist
- Natalya Meshcheryakova (born 1972), Russian freestyle swimmer
- Natalya Neidhart (born 1982), Canadian professional wrestler
- Natalya Pasichnyk (born 1971), Swedish-Ukrainian classical pianist
- Natalya Snytina (born 1971), Russian biathlete
- Natalya Sutyagina (born 1980), Russian butterfly swimmer
- Natalya Sumska (born 1956), Ukrainian actress of theater and cinema, television hostess
- Natalya Synyshyn (born 1985), Ukrainian (until 2013) and Azerbaijani (since 2014) wrestler
- Natalya Yakovenko (born 1942), Ukrainian historian and academic
- Natalya Yermolovich (born 1964), Soviet javelin thrower
- Natalya Zabolotnaya (born 1985), Russian weightlifter

== Fictional characters ==
- Natalya Rostova, Countess in War and Peace
- Natalya Simonova, Bond girl in GoldenEye
- Natalya, assassin in novel series H.I.V.E. (The Higher Institute of Villainous Education)
- Natalya, doll in the Groovy Girls line
- Natalya, a mage-type character in Arena of Valor

== See also ==
- Nataliya, female given name
