= Natalija =

Natalija (Serbian: Наталија) is the Serbian, Slovene and Lithuanian spelling of the name Natalia. It may refer to:

- Antonija Javornik (1893–1974), known as Natalija Bjelajac, Serbian women soldier
- Natalija Neti Munk (1864–1924), Serbian nurse and humanitarian worker
- Natalija Konstantinović (1882–1950), Princess of Montenegro
- Natalija Obrenović (1859–1941), Queen of Serbia
- Natalija Paulauskaitė, Lithuanian biathlon
- Natalija Prednik (born 1973), Slovenian sport shooter
- Natalija Stevanović (born 1994), Serbian tennis player
- Natalija Eder (born 1980), Austrian paralympian
- Natalie Gulbis (born 1983), American golfer
- Natalija Piliušina (born 1990), Lithuanian-American runner
- Natalija Golob (born 1986), Slovenian footballer
- Natalija Senić (born 2003), Serbian tennis player
- Natalija Ambrazaitė (born 2001), Lithuanian synchronized swimmer
- Natalija Cvetković (1888-1928), Serbian war artist

== See also ==
- Natalya, Russian variant.
- Ramonda nathaliae ("Natalija's ramonda"), flower
- Nataša, given name.
