= Chaudhry Nazeer Ahmad =

Pakistani politician (born 1958)

- چوہدری نذیر احمد

Member of the National Assembly of Pakistan
- In office 1 June 2013 – 31 May 2018
- Constituency: NA-167 (Vehari-I)
- In office 2002–2010
- Constituency: NA-167 (Vehari-I)

Personal details
- Born: 1 January 1958 (age 68) Burewala, Vehari
- Party: PMLN

Chaudhry Nazeer Ahmad (Punjabi: چوہدری نذیر احمد; born 1 January 1958) is a Pakistani politician who had been a member of the National Assembly of Pakistan between 2002 and May 2018.

== Early life ==
He was born on 1 January 1958 in Burewala.

== Political career ==
He was elected to the National Assembly of Pakistan as a candidate of Pakistan Muslim League (Q) (PML-Q) from Constituency NA-167 (Vehari-I) in the 2002 Pakistani general election. In the same election, he also ran for the seat of the Provincial Assembly of the Punjab as a candidate of PML-Q from Constituency PP-233 (Vehari-II) but was unsuccessful. He received 18,163 votes and was defeated by Nazir Ahmad Mithu Dogar, a candidate of Pakistan Muslim League (N) (PML-N).

He was re-elected to the National Assembly as a candidate of PML-Q from Constituency NA-167 (Vehari-I) in the 2008 Pakistani general election. He received 65,250 votes and defeated an independent candidate, Syed Sajid Mehdi. In the same election, he also ran for the seat of the National Assembly as an independent candidate from Constituency NA-168 (Vehari-II) but was unsuccessful. He received 282 votes and lost the seat to Azeem Daultana. In the same election, he also ran for the seat of the Provincial Assembly of the Punjab as a candidate of PML-Q from Constituency PP-233 (Vehari-II) but was unsuccessful. He received 19,912 votes and lost the seat to Sardar Khalid Saleem Bhatti, a candidate of PPP.

In 2010, he was disqualified to hold the National Assembly seat by the Supreme Court of Pakistan after he was found possessing fake degree.

He was re-elected to the National Assembly as a candidate of PML-N from Constituency NA-167 (Vehari-I) in the 2013 Pakistani general election. He received 99,907 votes and defeated an independent candidate in NA-167 Vehari-I (National Assembly of Pakistan constituency).

In October 2017, he was appointed as Federal Parliamentary Secretary for Law and Justice.
