= Natasha Tsukanova =

Russian businessperson (born 1967)

- Born: 4 February 1967 (age 59); Moscow, Russia
- Education: Moscow State University; Harvard
- Occupation: Business woman
- Known for: Founder The Tsukanov Family Foundation

Natasha Tsukanova (born 4 February 1967) is a businesswoman and philanthropist. She founded XENON Capital Partners and co-founded the Tsukanov Family Foundation.

== Early life and education ==
Natasha Tsukanova was born in Moscow, Russia in 1967. She earned a degree in economics from Moscow State University and was awarded a scholarship at Harvard. She also completed an MBA degree with Honors at INSEAD.

== Career ==
Tsukanova started her career in 1992 working in a group of economic advisors supported by Harvard University on the privatisation reforms in Russia, and subsequently at the Boston Consulting Group in London and Moscow.

In 1997, Tsukanova joined J.P. Morgan's energy team in London. In 2005, she was appointed Head of Investment Banking in the former Soviet CIS region, including in Russia, Ukraine and the Central Asian states. During this time, J.P. Morgan achieved a foremost position in the region in terms of M&A deals.

In 2007, Tsukanova was involved in structuring several emerging markets transactions, including advising on IPOs of regional companies, such as Rosneft and Sberbank. Her team worked on restructuring of the electric power industry and the privatisation of RAO UES.

Two years later, Tsukanova founded advisory firm XENON Capital Partners, which originally specialised in the power and energy sectors. The company has acted as a financial adviser for clients on strategic M&A transactions, capital raising and investment initiatives.

During Tsukanova's tenure as Managing Director for XENON, the created an international consortium of private equity investors in 2014 to acquire a 26.43% stake in power producer OJSC ENEL OGK-5. The sale of 26.4% of Enel OGK-5, a utility controlled by Italy's Enel SpA, to a group of four investors.

In 2014, Tsukanova advised on the acquisition of a 50% stake in the Etinde oil and gas concession in Cameroon by a consortium of LUKOIL and New Age. Two years later, XENON was named in Vedomosti as one of the top three financial advisers by deal value with the sale of a 40% stake in Irkutskenergo for $1bn. XENON consulted Eurasia Drilling Co (EDC) and its core shareholders when Schlumberger NV made an offer to purchase a 51% stake in the company in 2017.

Tsukanova is on the advisory board of fund manager Kerogen Capital, an Asia-based $2bn energy private equity fund.

During 2022, with Tsukanova as managing director, Xenon Capital served as a financial advisor to the Global Fashion Group (GFG).

In 2023, during the Russian invasion of Ukraine, Tsukanova’s firm Xenon Capital advised a number of international companies on exiting Russia. In an article by the Financial Times, Tsukanova was quoted as saying: "No one wants to sell to a sanctioned buyer, let alone companies that are under sanctions themselves. However, those unaffected by sanctions often lack sufficient funds."

== Philanthropy ==
In 2021, Tsukanova helped launch ballet NFTs with the ballerina Natalia Osipova, a Principal of The Royal Ballet in London. The NFTs featuring three video performances by Osipova were offered at Bonhams auction house in London.

Natasha, together with her husband Igor Tsukanov founded the Tsukanov Family Foundation (TFF), which supports projects in the arts, culture and education. Among its significant projects are collaborations with the Saatchi Gallery, the provision of scholarships at British schools, and support of productions at the Royal Opera House.

The Tsukanov Foundation also supports various programmes in the field of art education, including at the Yale School of Art (USA), Goldsmiths (UK) and the Institute of Contemporary Art (ICA, Russia). The TFF owns collections of post-war Soviet art and has donated important pieces to international museums.

For six years, Natasha served on the board of directors of the London Philharmonic Orchestra. She was appointed Chair of the International Board of Governors of the London Philharmonic Orchestra in 2018. She also served on the Development Committee and Board of Honorary Directors of the Royal Opera House.

During March 2023, Tsukanova interviewed musical director and conductor Vladimir Jurowski. The interview took place after both Opera director Dmitry Chernyakov and Vladimir Jurowski held a Bavarian Opera performance of Prokofiev's opera, War and Peace. Tsukanova’s interview covered the issues and topic of how to stage an anti-war opera with Ukrainian, Russian, and Belarusian artists in the same performance piece.

In December 2024, the Tsukanov Family Foundation and Bird&Carrot Productions presented Fragile: A Collective Exhibition at The Bomb Factory in London. Curated by Daniel Lismore in support of Artists at Risk, a charity assisting creatives worldwide, the show featured 20 international artists examining themes of fragility, displacement, and resilience. Participants included Charlotte Colbert, Joseph Corré, Pandemonia, Craig Robertson, Sharon Walters, Martha Freud, Ian Brennan, Leila Bartell, Curtis Holder, Marc Quinn, and Nicola Turner, among others.

== Awards and recognition ==
In 1996, Tsukanova was the recipient of the Edward A. Hewitt Prize by the American Association for the Advancement of Slavic Studies. The award was presented due to her article on "Competition Policy in Russia During and After Privatization".

== Personal life ==
Tsukanova is married to art collector Igor Tsukanov. She lives in London with her husband and children.
