= Ishaq Khan Khakwani =

Pakistani politician

- Appointed by: Imran Khan

Minister of State for Information Technology, Telecommunications and Railways
- In office 20 August 2004 – 15 November 2007
- President: Pervez Musharraf
- Prime Minister: Shaukat Aziz

Personal details
- Born: Ishaq Khan Khakwani; 1 April 1949 (age 77) Lahore, Punjab Province, Pakistan
- Citizenship: Pakistan
- Education: University of Engineering and Technology, Lahore
- Occupation: Politician

Ishaq Khan Khakwani (born 1 April 1949) is a senior Pakistani politician, engineer and a wealthy landlord. He has served as the Minister of State for Information Technology, Telecommunications and Railways. He served as the senior vice-president of Pakistan Tehreek-e-Insaf. He was elected for his first term as Parliamentarian as a Pakistan Muslim League (Q) candidate. Ishaq Khan Khakwani completed his BSc in electrical engineering from the University of Engineering and Technology, Lahore in 1971 and worked as an engineer in Pakistan Railways for 18 years before entering the political arena. Currently, his occupation is that of an agriculturist. He has also served on the Government Task Force on Agriculture, Reduction of WAPDA's electricity tariff and WTO. He was also the member of National Assembly Committees on Economic Affairs and Statistics, Standing Committee on Food Agriculture and Livestock and Standing Committee on Railways.

== Education and work ==
Khakwani went to Sadiq Public School Bahawalpur (a Boarding school) from where he passed his Senior Cambridge certificate exams in 1965. Later he joined Forman Christian College, Lahore and passed his Secondary Exams in pre-Engineering subjects in 1967. After which he was admitted into Engineering University, Mughalpura, Lahore and obtained his Electrical engineering Degree with distinction, in 1967. Was School Prefect and declared the Best Athlete of the school in 1964 &1965. Khakwani joined the Pakistan Railways service through Federal Public Service Commission in 1973 and served there till he resigned his job in 1990.

== Politics ==
Khakwani started his politics with Mir Murtaza Bhutto's Pakistan Peoples Party (SB) in 1994 and later joined Pakistan Muslim League in 2002. He was amongst the more than 30 electables & heavyweights with Jehangir Tareen that joined Pakistan Tehreek e Insaf after its successful 30 October rally in Lahore. He was later appointed a central leader and SVP.

=== General Election 2018 ===
Ishaq Khan Khakwani contested the 2018 Pakistani general election on PTI ticket from NA163 Vehari. Mr. Khakwani lost the election to PMLN candidate Syed Sajid Mehdi by a margin of 13,452 votes.

== Family and personal life ==
Ishaq Khan belongs to Khakwani family. They have been settled in Multan for quite a while and the Khogyani Tribes' branch in Pakistan is known as the Khakwani family, and they are the major landowners in at least three of the four provinces and a minor presence in the fourth. He is married with three sons. Khakwani started playing polo in 1975 and actively played nationally and internationally till 2002. He is serving as the Federation International Polo (FIP) Ambassador. He has also managed sports organisations in Pakistan in Honorary positions, i.e., Pakistan Hockey, Pakistan Polo, and Pakistan Athletics.
