= Tasha Biltmore =

American actress, playwright and director

- Born: Detroit, Michigan, U.S.
- Occupation(s): Actress, Playwright, Director and Producer
- Years active: 2010–present

Tasha Biltmore is an American actress, playwright and director. She is best known for her work on the stage plays The Conversation, The Betrayal and Roxy.

== Life and career ==
Tasha was born in Detroit, Michigan. She is the founder of Biltmore Productions. Her stage play The Conversation is about domestic violence.

== Filmography ==
As Actress

- 2016-2017 - underPAID (TV Series)
- 2013 - Vamp (TV Series)
- 2012 - Damien's Quest (TV Series)
- 2011 - Situations (TV Series)

As director

- 2014 - A.I.M: Angry Insecure Men
