= Tasha-Nicole Terani =

Soccer training and ball control expert

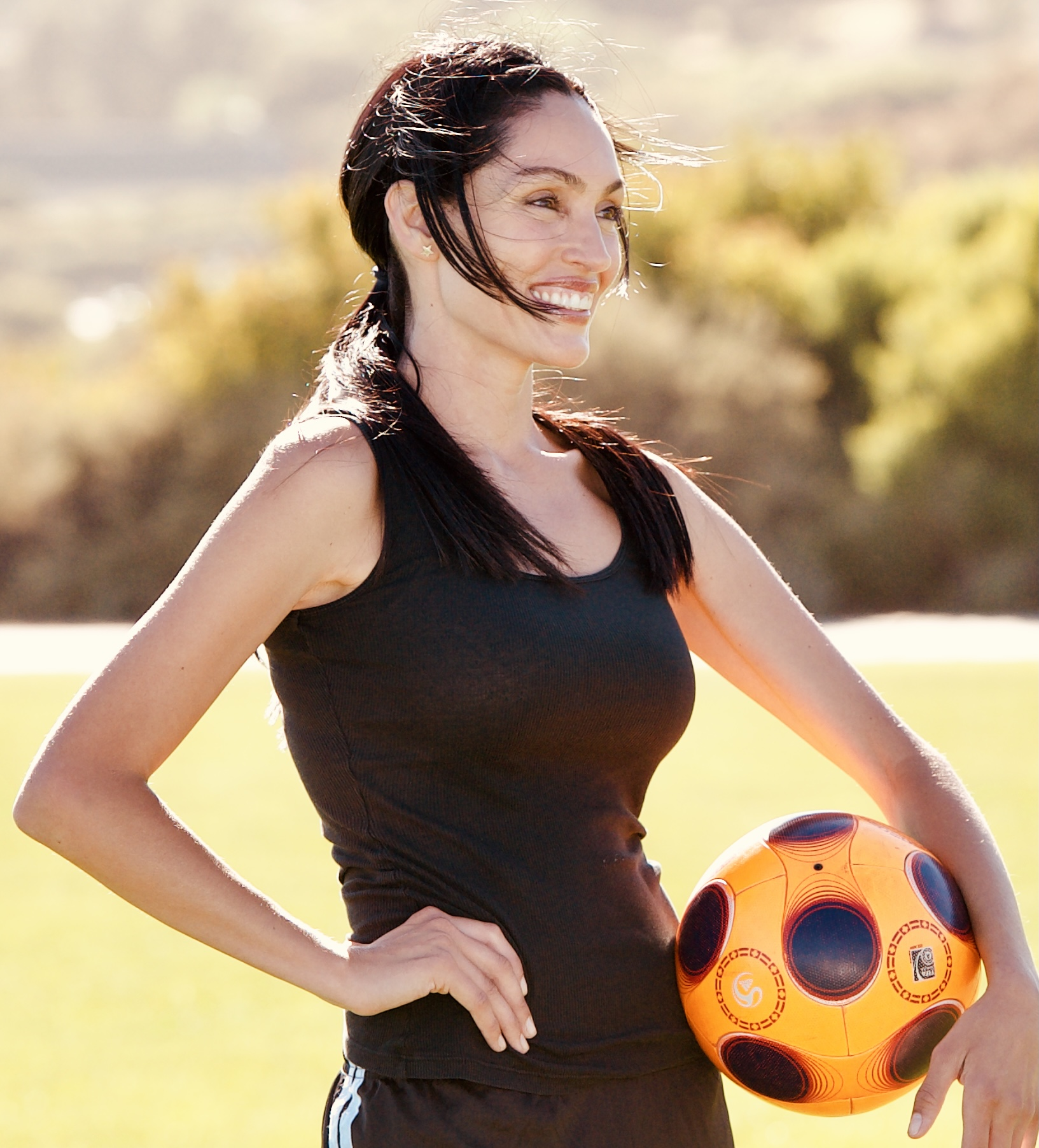
- Occupation(s): CEO, Athlete, Award Winning Author, Model
- Organization(s): TNT Soccer System, Every Childs Dream Foundation NPO, A Tree for Me Book
- Known for: UN Special Envoy for Peace, Soccer Ball Control World Record Holder, Writer

Tasha-Nicole Terani, also known as TNT, is an American soccer training and ball control expert, eight times world record holder for soccer ball control, United Nations Special Envoy for Peace through Soccer, and founder of the Every Child’s Dream Foundation 501c3.

== Early life ==
Terani was born in Tehran, Iran. She later moved to the United States and grew up in Westlake Village, California.

== Career ==
When she was 14, she started modeling and moved to New York. She modeled for various brands in New York, Los Angeles, and Atlanta. Terani has been featured in Sports Illustrated and the Time magazine. In 2003, she moved back to Los Angeles to start a soccer business.

In 2012, she created and produced a soccer technique program called the TNT Soccer System. In the same year, Terani released a video training program called Soccer Ball Control with Tasha-Nicole.

Terani became a published author and poet in 2024. Her debut children’s book, A Tree for Me, has received international recognition and several awards. The book explores the journey to find unconditional love.

A Tree for Me is the first installment in her series titled The Nature and Nurture Book Series. Tasha-Nicole’s work primarily focuses on themes of love, nature, and human connection.

Terani has made several world records for ball control, including:

=== Guinness World Records ===
- Record holder for most between the legs figure eights with a football (soccer ball) in one minute, in Westlake Village, USA, on February 08, 2021.
- Record holder for the most between the legs figure eights with the football (soccer ball) in 30 seconds in 9 in Westlake Village, California, USA, on May 08, 2020.
- The most touches of a football in one minute by a female, while keeping the ball in the air is 269, in Atlanta, Georgia, USA, on September 04, 2003.
- Most touches of a soccer ball in 30 seconds (female) was broken on The Today Show in New York, USA, on August 29, 2003.
- Most touches of a football in 30 seconds by a woman while keeping the ball in the air is 137, in New York, USA, on August 27, 2003.
- Most touches of a football in 30 seconds by a female while keeping the ball in the air is 123 at DeKalb Memorial Stadium, Atlanta, Georgia, on February 22, 2003.

=== European records ===
- Speed juggling: 137 touches (kicks) in 30 seconds on 27 August 2003.
- Speed juggling: 269 touches (kicks) in 60 seconds on 4 September 2003.

=== Philanthropy ===
==== Every Child’s Dream Foundation 501c3 ====
In September 2009, Terani founded Every Child’s Dream Foundation 501c3, an NGO for orphaned and abandoned children. It provides emotional and financial support to orphanages around the world. As of 2020, the NGO has delivered care packages to more than 96 countries.

==== United Nations Special Envoy for Peace through Soccer ====
Terani has been serving as United Nations Special Envoy for International Youth Soccer since March 2004. Her responsibility is to promote peace through soccer around the world.
