= Natalya Zemna =

Ukrainian herbalist

- Born: Nataliya Petrivna Yushchenko; 5 January 1942; Krekhaiv, Chernihiv Oblast, Ukrainian SSR, (now Ukraine)
- Citizenship: Ukraine
- Education: Kyiv National University of Culture and Arts, Moscow Literature Institute, Kyiv Alternative Medicine Institute
- Known for: Herbalism
- Awards: Order of Merit (Ukraine), Order of St. Equal-to-the-apostles prince Vladimir, International humanitarian Pushkin society award winner, First laureate of Eupraxia prize, Vernadsky prize
- Scientific career
- Fields: Herbalism; Folk medicine Literature; Ecology movement
- Workplaces: The Green Planet Naturopathy Association

Natalya Zemna (real name: Nataliya Petrivna Zubytska, maiden name: Yushchenko) was born on 5 January 1942 in Krekhaiv, Chernihiv Oblast, UkrSSR (now Ukraine). She is a Ukrainian herbalist and healer. She also serves as a president of The Green Planet Naturopathy Association.

== Biography and education ==
Born on 5 January 1942 in the village of Krekhaiv, situated in Chernihiv Oblast, URSR, Natalia Zemna was raised in the family of traditional herbalists and wildcrafters, and thus became interested in the world of plants from the early age. She obtained her first knowledge of medicinal plants from her mother and grandmother. She graduated from three higher education institutions: Kyiv National University of Culture and Arts (1979), Moscow Literature Institute (1981) and Kyiv Alternative Medicine Institute (1994). Additionally, she took specialized courses in the Ukrainian Folk Medicine Association.

An unlucky occurrence in Natalia Zemna's private life became a powerful incentive to her deep scientific research in the field of herbology. Already middle-aged, she was diagnosed with a complicated heart condition, which, according to the doctors of the conventional medicine, required urgent surgery. Unwilling to have on operation, Natalia intuitively started self-administering herbal remedies and soon recovered. Having married Danylo Nykyforovych Zubytsky, a hereditary healer in the third generation, Natalia started to work in the Apothecary of Folk Medicine (Apteka narodnykh likiv) in 1991.

In 2011 she starred in the made-for-YouTube documentary series Zemna Styhija (English: The Earth Element) about the healing power of plants. A year later Natalia Zemna's official website called Privet, Internet! (English: Hello, Internet) launched.

To attract more young people to her official website Natalia Zemna jointly with the Italian record producer Hangm_n recorded track "Dance for Health!" - dubstep variation on a theme of the Ukrainian folk song "Tsvite Teren" (English: "Blackthorn Blossoms"). Video premiere took place on 14 August 2012.

In the 2012 Ukrainian parliamentary election Zemna (under her own name) was a candidate for the party Green Planet in constituency 121; but she lost there and thus missed parliamentary representation.
