= Choudhry Faqir Ahmad =

Pakistani politician

Member of the National Assembly of Pakistan
- In office 13 August 2018 – 10 August 2023
- Constituency: NA-162 (Vehari-I)

Personal details
- Party: AP (2025-present)
- Other political affiliations: PMLN (2018-2025)

Choudhry Faqir Ahmad is a Pakistani politician who had been a member of the National Assembly of Pakistan from August 2018 till August 2023.

== Political career ==
He was elected to the National Assembly of Pakistan from Constituency NA-162 (Vehari-I) as a candidate of Pakistan Muslim League (N) in the 2018 Pakistani general election.
