= Natasha Sara Georgeos =

Saint Lucian swimmer (born 1987)

Personal information
- Full name: Natasha Sara Georgeos
- National team: Saint Lucia
- Born: 6 August 1987 (age 38) Castries, Saint Lucia
- Height: 1.66 m (5 ft 5 in)
- Weight: 65 kg (143 lb)

Sport
- Sport: Swimming
- Strokes: Butterfly

Natasha Sara Georgeos (born August 6, 1987) is a Saint Lucian swimmer, who specialized in butterfly events. Georgeos qualified for the women's 100 m butterfly at the 2004 Summer Olympics in Athens, without posting her entry time.
