= Natasha Holmes =

Physics education researcher

- Education: UBC (Ph.D. 2014, M.S. 2011); University of Guelph (B.S. 2009)
- Scientific career
- Fields: Physics; Educational research
- Workplaces: Cornell University
- Doctoral advisor: Douglas Bonn
- Other academic advisors: Carl Wieman

Natasha Holmes is a physics education researcher and the Ann S. Bowers Associate Professor of Physics at Cornell University. She researches teaching and learning in physics and STEM fields including how students acquire knowledge, the effects of course environment on learning, and the development of scientific ways of thinking. She completed her undergraduate degree at the University of Guelph in 2009 then went to UBC to get her Master's and Ph.D. by 2014 before becoming a post-doctoral researcher at Stanford University and then on to a professorship at Cornell University in 2017.

== Research ==
As a graduate student she began researching structured inquiry and critical thinking in physics labs at UBC and was the executive coordinator of Let's Talk Science from 2012 to 2014. While working with Carl Wieman at Stanford University, Holmes developed and tested new methods to teach critical thinking by instructing students more explicitly to analyze and share data and ideas with other groups. As part of her research at Cornell University she began the Cornell Physics Education Research Lab (CPERL) and her group has since researched topics covering physics lab courses, virtual reality as a teaching tool, and the development of a concept inventory designed to probe critical thinking in physics labs.

In 2022, Holmes published work on equity in physics lab groups and found that the observed gender inequity of lab roles could not be explained by student preference. Among other findings, this study found that students had no preference for group gender composition, very few students indicated a preference for a single group leader, and women generally preferred sharing rather than dividing or rotating roles.
