= Natasha Barrett =

Natasha Barrett may refer to:

- Natasha Barrett (television reporter), American broadcast journalist
- Natasha Barrett (composer) (born 1972), British contemporary music composer
