= Natasha Carter =

British journalist and ITV presenter

Natasha Carter is a British journalist and an ITV presenter for Good Morning Britain.

She used to present the Good Morning Granada breakfast bulletins for Granada Reports.

In 2011 Carter was selected from more than 1000 applicants for the ITV News Traineeship. She mentors young journalists for the Media Trust.
