= Ohad Naharin =

Israeli choreographer and dancer

- אוהד נהרין
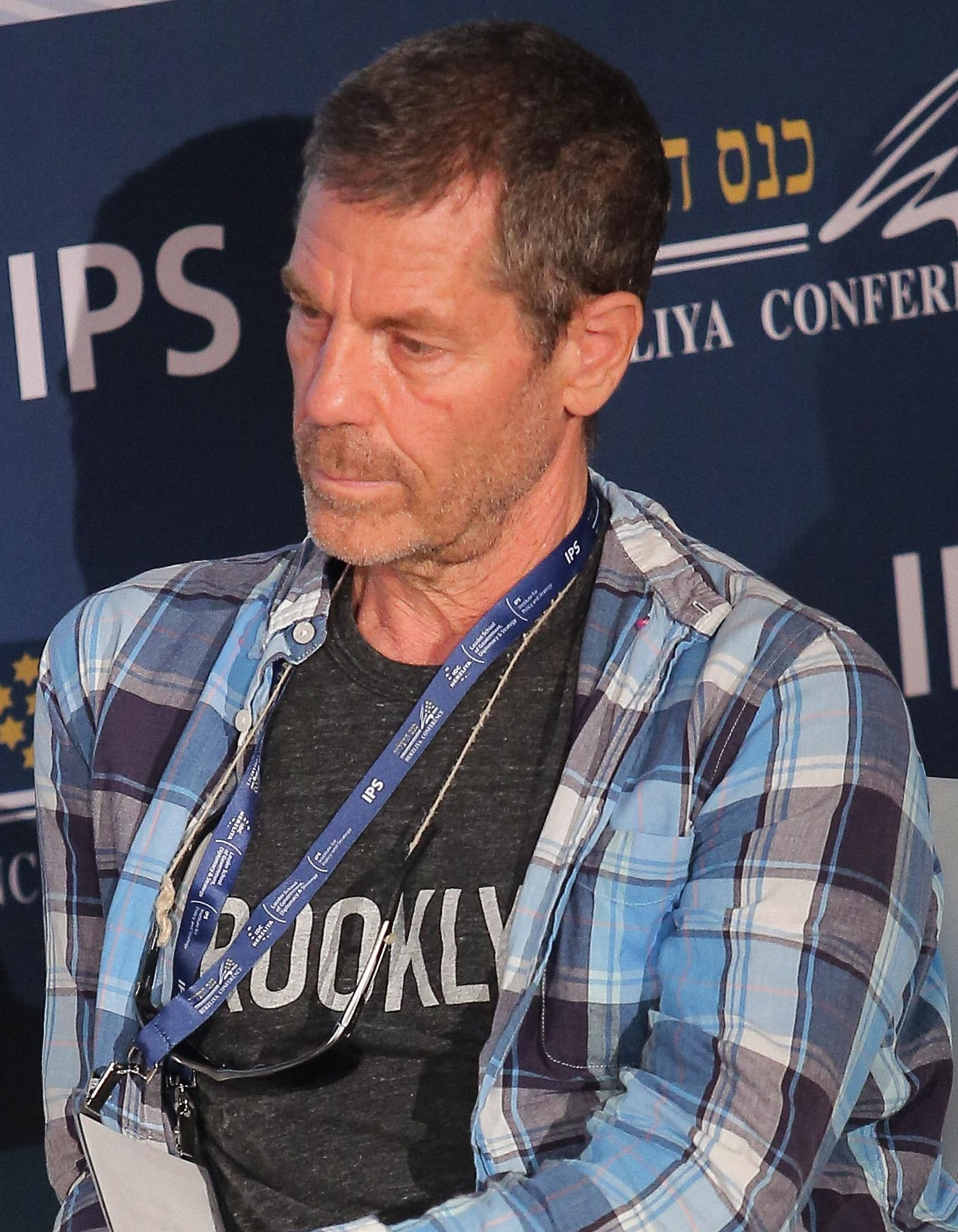
- Naharin in 2016
- Born: 22 June 1952 (age 74); Kibbutz Mizra, Israel
- Citizenship: Israeli and American
- Occupations: Contemporary dancer, choreographer and dance company artistic director to 2018
- Employer: Batsheva Dance Company
- Style: Contemporary dance
- Title: House choreographer
- Spouse(s): Mari Kajiwara (1978 ~ 2001); Eri Nakamura (~ present)
- Children: 1 daughter (with Eri Nakamura)
- Awards: 1998 "Chevalier de l’Ordre des Arts et des Lettres"; 2005 Israel Prize; 2009 EMET Prize; 2010 dance magazine award 2013 honorary doctor Juilliard school

Ohad Naharin (Hebrew: אוהד נהרין; born 1952) is an Israeli choreographer, contemporary dancer, and creator and teacher of a unique system/language/pedagogy of dance called Gaga. He served as artistic director of Batsheva Dance Company from 1990; he stepped down in 2018.

== Biography ==
Ohad Naharin was born in 1952 in Kibbutz Mizra. Raised in an artistic home, he wrote stories, composed music, and painted as a child. His father was a psychologist specializing in psychodrama and an actor who performed with Habima and the Haifa Theater. His mother was a Feldenkrais instructor, choreographer and dancer. Naharin served in the Northern Command Band as a choreographer for one of their programs. Nevertheless, Naharin did not start dancing until age 22. During his first year with the Batsheva Dance Company, Martha Graham visited Israel and invited Naharin to join her dance company in New York. After dancing for Martha Graham, he attended Juilliard and the School of American Ballet.

In 1978, he married Mari Kajiwara, a native New Yorker and an Alvin Ailey dancer. In 2001, she died of cancer at age 50.

He is now married to Eri Nakamura, a Batsheva dancer and costume designer with whom he has a daughter.

== Batsheva Dance Company ==
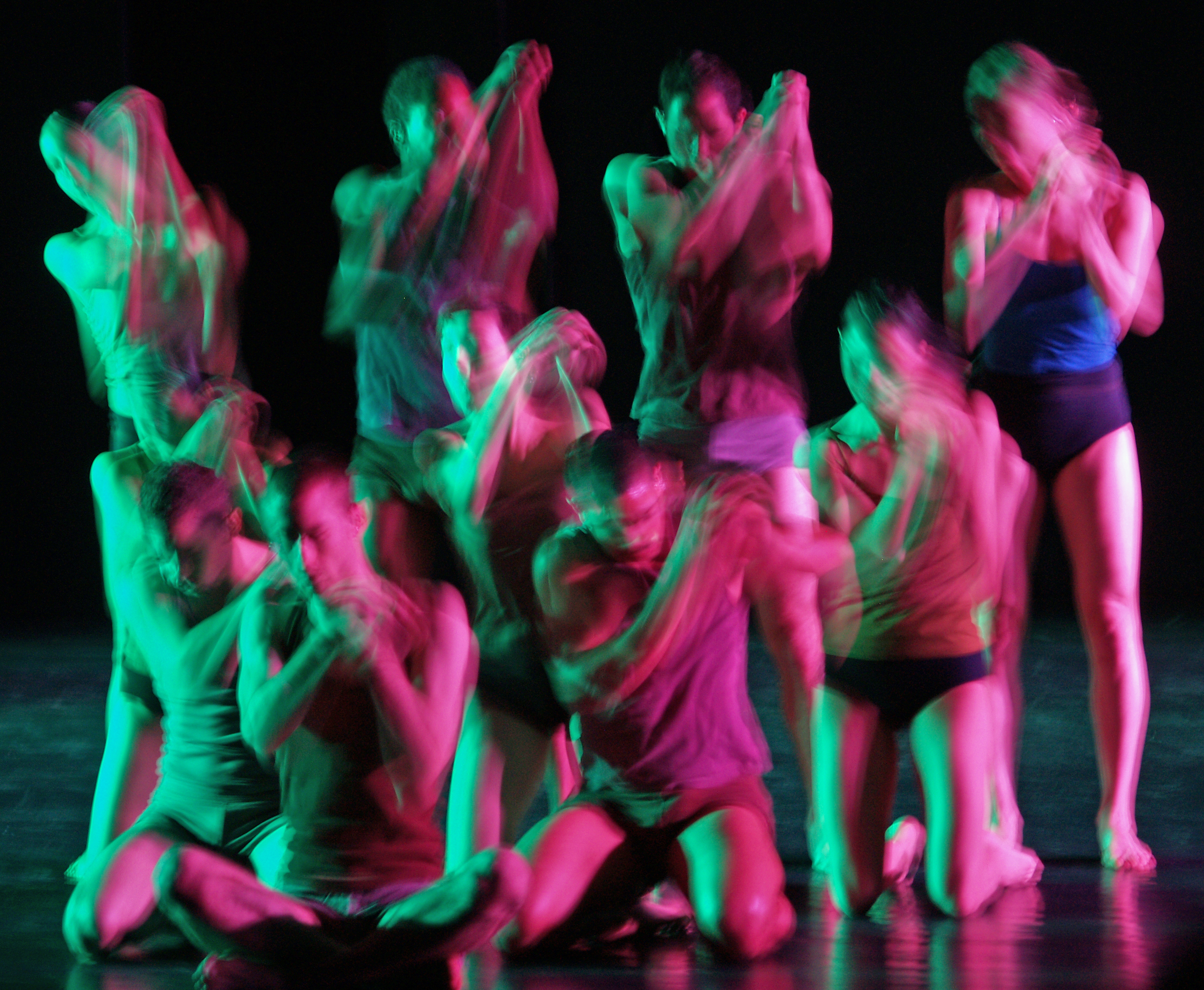
Batsheva Dance Company

Naharin is currently the House Choreographer of Batsheva Dance Company. He served as Artistic Director as well until 2018. In 1990, Naharin was appointed Artistic Director, there by launching the company into a new stage. The company is international in nature, made up of individually unique dancers from Israel and other countries. Dancers are encouraged to affirm their distinct creative gifts, as creators on their own.

Naharin's signature style and technique has developed during his time with Batsheva. His style is "distinguished by stunningly flexible limbs and spines, deeply grounded movement, explosive bursts and a vitality that grabs a viewer by the collar". His dancers do not rehearse in front of a mirror as this enables them to move away from self-critique and allows them to feel the movement from within. Naharin is known to be a reserved and private person, and this is apparent in the studio as well. He does not get angry or raise his voice, but comments constructively and calmly. Since he has also been musically trained, Naharin sometimes collaborates on the compositions used in his pieces.

== Gaga ==
During his time directing and teaching the Batsheva Company, Naharin developed Gaga, a movement language and pedagogy that has defined the company's training and continues to characterize Israeli contemporary dance. A practice that resists codification and emphasizes the practitioner's somatic experience, Gaga presents itself as a movement language rather than a movement 'technique'. Classes consist of a teacher leading dancers through an improvisational practice based on a series of images described by the teacher. Naharin explains that such a practice is meant to provide a framework or a "safety net" for the dancers to use to "move beyond familiar limits". The descriptions that are used to guide the dancers through the improvisation are intended to help the dancer initiate and express movement in unique ways from parts of the body that tend to be ignored in other dance settings. One example is the image of "Luna", which refers to the fleshy, moon-shaped regions between fingers and toes. In keeping with Gaga's insistence on moving through sensing and imagining, mirrors are discouraged in rehearsal spaces.

== Choreography ==
Naharin's works have been commissioned by the Frankfurt Ballet, Opéra National de Paris, Grand Théâtre de Genève, Sydney Dance Company, Lyon Opera Ballet, Les Grands Ballets Canadiens, Rambert Dance Company, Compañia Nacional de Danza, Cullberg Ballet, Finnish National Ballet, Ballet Gulbenkian, Balé da Cidade de São Paulo, Bavarian State Ballet, Cedar Lake Contemporary Ballet, Pittsburgh Ballet Theatre, Hubbard Street Dance Chicago and Royal Danish Ballet. nederland dance theater, kibbutz dance co, Ballet de l'Opéra de Nantes, swedish ballet, atlanta ballet, ballet BC, Ballet de l'Opéra de Marseille and many more

He seeks to create movement that is universal yet personal. He always has a clear social and political conscience in his works, but his dances are not meant to be political. He finds storytelling of suffering and the world's problems boring in comparison to a person's ability to use texture and multi-layered movement. He contrasts physical explosiveness with stillness, taking an interest in contrasts, edges, and extremes, which creates vital distance and space in dances. His philosophy, shared with many who devote their lives to choreography, is that everyone should dance. Deca Dance highlights many excerpts from his previous works. Naharin says himself, "Deca Dance is not a new work. It is more about reconstruction: I like to take pieces or sections of existing works and rework it, reorganize it and create the possibility to look at it from a new angle. It always teaches me something new about my work and composition. In Deca Dance I took sections from different works. It was like I was telling only either the beginning, middle or ending of many stories but when I organized it the result become as coherent as the original if not more."

In Max, "Mr. Naharin’s theatrical ingredients are space, movement and light." A critic comments, "In this tremendously potent work, there are few obvious displays of emotion, yet Max is full of imagery that slips between real life and dance in fleeting flashes."

Anafaza, a work for 22 dancers and two musicians that premiered in December 1993, combined elements of theater, opera, film and rock music as well as dance. According to Naharin, it "deals with small sculptures in a big space" and explores the abilities of the human body. Anafaza was restaged in 2024 by the Batsheva Dance Company and the Batsheva Ensemble.

Shorter and less complex than Ohad Naharin's other pieces, Echad mi Yodea finds power in its simple staging and wild, almost uncontrolled, movement. Chairs are arranged in a semicircle around the stage and dancers wear identical black suits. The movement is set to the traditional Passover song of the same name which "enumerates the thirteen attributes of God". It is a counting Hebrew song, meaning each verse builds upon the previous one. Naharin uses the cumulative nature of the song and matches it with his own type of repetition, specifically with the chorus. Prior to each chorus, a ripple occurs from stage right to stage left in which each dancer arches their back with splayed arms and bent legs, only to slowly be seated again. The final member of the semicircle, however, does not re-seat himself; instead, he falls to the ground. As he lays there, the rest of the dancers stand up from their chairs and powerfully deliver the lines of the chorus: “Echad mi yodea? Echad ani yodea. Echad Elokeinu, shebashamaim uva’aretz” (Who knows one? I know one. One is God, our God of the heavens and of earth). He then returns to his seat as the entire stage settles for a brief moment of tranquility. This action repeats itself thirteen times. It eventually becomes too much, and the dancers – excluding the stage left performer – forcefully shed and throw off their clothing piece by piece until they are standing in front of their chairs in just their undergarments, the pile of shed clothing thrown astray. As the lights and music fade, the "other" simply returns to his seat still fully clothed, while the other dancers stand proudly and exhausted in their undergarments.

Naharin's Echad mi Yodea has a variety of interpretations – the shedding of one's skin, the inescapable bond with one's past, finding beauty in chaos, the singular within a group and the dichotomy between exhaustion and strength. One of the most spoken about interpretations, however, is that of the liberation of a community. This understanding is related to the "gatkes incident". In 1998, Echad mi Yodea was set to perform at a celebration of Israel's 50th anniversary as a nation-state. Government officials argued with Naharin, urging him to "let the dancers wear gatkes (Yiddish for long underwear) because conservative officials would be in attendance". It was an attempt at censorship, but Naharin refused, instead pulling Batsheva from the performance and allowing for the liberation in Echad mi Yodea to continue. Like the "gatkes incident" demonstrates, even when faced with criticism, Naharin continues to push the boundaries of traditional dance. As Gaby Aldor, a dance critic specializing in Israeli dance, writes:

"Naharin's movement is rough, lacking in balletic elegance yet inventing a new kind of virtuosity. Explosive and fast, Naharin's dancers move as if their bodies are possessed of an inner strength, yet governed too by external forces about to tear apart the body. There is a bodily reaching beyond one's boundaries, a different borderlessness that involves dancers pushing the limits of the familiar and safe: a dancer's high lifted leg turns more than I80 degrees, another jumps sideways and down in a risky dive, a backward arch turns into a leap. It happens in the body and in the mind alike, and it happens to the individual, the one who takes responsibility for his breathtaking trespassing".

Other pieces he has choreographed include Three, Tabula Rasa, Mabul, Pas de Pepsi, Haru No Umi, In Common, Sixty a Minute, Black Milk, Innostress, Mamootot, moshe, yag, sabotage baby, perpetuum, Passo Mezzo, Kamuiot, plastelina, Naharin's Virus, Hora, Sadeh21, The Hole.

== Mr. Gaga documentary ==
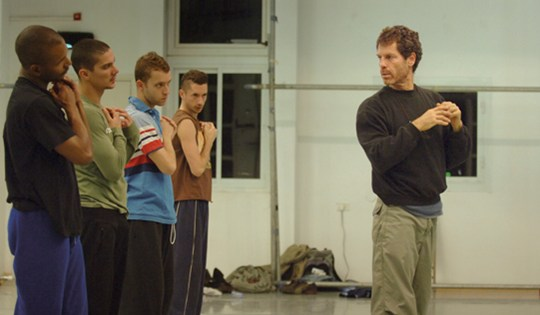
Ohad Naharin instructing dancers

In 2015, a documentary about Naharin called Mr. Gaga by Tomer Heymann premiered. This documentary's title is a reference to the movement language created by Naharin, Gaga. The documentary explores how Naharin and his movement style have influenced Batsheva Dance Company and the modern dance world. Gaga movement stems from Naharin's belief that "physical pleasure from physical activity is part of being alive," and the connection between effort and pleasure through movement. The documentary examines both Naharin's life and his choreographic work, explicating how his work has shaped the dance world. Naharin was also featured in the Netflix 5-episode docuseries Move.

== Awards ==
- In 1998, Naharin was awarded the "Chevalier de l’Ordre des Arts et des Lettres" by the French government.
- In 2005, he was awarded the Israel Prize, for dance.
- In 2009, he was honored with the Samuel H. Scripps American Dance Festival for lifetime achievement in dance.
- In 2009, he was awarded the EMET Prize for contributing to advancing arts and science in Israel.
- In 2009, he received Honorary degree from the Hebrew University of Jerusalem.
- in 2013, he received Honorary degree from the Juilliard School.

== See also ==
- List of Israel Prize recipients
- Dance of Israel
- Culture of Israel
