= Natasha Noel =

Indian yoga instructor

Natasha Noel (born 14 September 1997) is an Indian yoga instructor, dancer, and media personality.

She was named one of the BBC 100 Women (inspiring and influential women from around the world) in 2019.

== Life and career ==
Noel was born in 1997 in Kerala. She is a native of Mumbai, India. Noel lost her mother when she was three years old. She suffered from child abuse, and was involved in an accident which inflicted her with an injury that left her in bed rest for a long time. Following her recovery, she was engaged in a long-time relationship but her boyfriend broke off the relationship.

She then took to yoga, photography, and dancing to manage stress.

She enrolled in The Yoga Institute at Santacruz before studying yoga at the Ashtanga Vinyasa at Mysore.

She was on the list of BBC 100 women for 2019.
