= Natasha S. Alford =

American journalist

- Born: June 8, 1986 (age 39); Syracuse, New York
- Education: Harvard University; Northwestern University’s Medill School of Journalism
- Occupation(s): Journalist, digital media executive, and public speaker
- Notable work: Afro-Latinx Revolution: Puerto Rico
- Awards: "Emerging Journalist of the Year" by the National Association of Black Journalists (2018); Pulitzer Center for Crisis Reporting grantee (2019)

Natasha S. Alford (born June 8, 1986) is an American journalist, digital media executive, and public speaker. She currently serves as VP of Digital Content and senior correspondent for theGrio, and a CNN Political Analyst.

== Early life ==
Alford was born in Syracuse, New York. Her mother is Puerto Rican and her father is African American. Alford graduated from Harvard University with a Bachelor of Arts degree in Social Studies. Alford later earned a master's degree in broadcast journalism from Northwestern University's Medill School of Journalism.

== Career ==
Alford's first job out of college was at Bridgewater Associates, a hedge fund in Connecticut. She left to pursue a career in education, eventually becoming a middle school English teacher.

Alford began her journalism career as a general assignment news reporter at WROC-TV (News 8) in Rochester, New York. In 2016, she joined The Grio as Deputy Editor and was promoted to Vice President of Digital Content in 2019. Alford began appearing regularly on CNN in 2019. In 2020, Alford launched TheGrio's first podcast, Dear Culture.

In addition to her work in journalism, Alford is a public speaker and has delivered talks on topics such as diversity and inclusion and media representation.

Alford executive produced and directed the documentary "Afro-Latinx Revolution: Puerto Rico" with Defend Puerto Rico. The film explores the history and culture of the Afro-Latino community in Puerto Rico and highlights the experiences of Black Puerto Ricans who have historically faced discrimination and marginalization. The documentary was acquired by Freestyle Digital Media, a subsidiary of Byron Allen's Entertainment Studios, and was made available for streaming on Amazon Prime Video.

== Activism ==
Alford has worked to raise awareness about various issues affecting marginalized communities. In 2023, she awarded three scholarships to aspiring high school journalists from underrepresented backgrounds in her hometown Syracuse.

== Awards and recognition ==
In recognition of her work, Alford has been named "Emerging Journalist of the Year" by the National Association of Black Journalists in 2018 and a 2019 Pulitzer Center for Crisis Reporting grantee. As part of the grant, she produced an original Amazon Prime Video documentary titled "Afro-Latinx Revolution: Puerto Rico” (2020).

She also served as a Journalist-In-Residence at Syracuse University.

== Personal life ==
Alford is a lupus advocate and has opened up about living with the autoimmune condition.
