= Gaga (movement language) =

Pedagogy movement

Gaga is a movement language and pedagogy developed by Batsheva Dance Company director and teacher Ohad Naharin. Used in some Israeli contemporary dance, it has two educational tracks which are taught in Israel as well as several other countries:

- Gaga/Dancers, intended for trained dancers, which comprises the daily training of the Batsheva Dance Company
- Gaga/People, designed for the general public, which requires no dance training.

Many dancers have said that Gaga classes have reignited their passion for dance, and provided new ways to connect to their freedom and creativity in movement without self-consciousness.

Gaga students improvise their movements based on somatic experience and imagery described by the teacher, which provides a framework promoting unconventional movement. The imagery guides the performers' movement expressivity by focusing attention on specific body regions. For example, "Luna", "Lena", "Biba", "Tama" and many other words are used to experiment in a performer's body while they are dancing. Mirrors are avoided, to facilitate movement guided by sensing and imagining rather than seeing.

== About ==
The Gaga movement language was created by Ohad Naharin, former Martha Graham dancer and artistic director of the Batsheva Dance Company (1990-2018), and has been further developed in relation to Naharin's research in dance and choreography. Naharin created Gaga as a reaction to a back injury he was experiencing. The language is intended to facilitate communication with the dancers and help them care for their bodies while also testing their physical limitations. The terminology within the language often emphasizes pleasure and freedom. The idea is that the mind can undertake many tasks and the body can still explore its power, so long as it adheres to pleasure; the movement can be uninhibited, as pleasure prevents injury. The language allows for the breaking of movement habits and the experience of effort and exaggeration, with an emphasis on sensation.

== Methodology ==
A Gaga class is given as a procession of instructions that give access to bodily sensations. Each instruction is meant to help the dancer use mental approaches to create physical research. Because Gaga depends on the actual setting and people involved, there is no uniform class structure, though specific methodologies are employed.

=== Float ===
A floating sensation (referred to as 'float') is cultivated throughout. Float does not ignore the existence of gravity. However rather than giving into gravity and adhering to heaviness, the body uses gravity as a force of energy and even elevation of the limbs. Naharin states: “We sense the weight of our body parts, yet, our form is not shaped by gravity.” Additionally, float is intended to facilitate a constant awareness and activeness in which dancers are never completely released, even when they are doing nothing, leaving them 'available' for movement.

=== Vocabulary ===
Naharin created Gaga terminology specific to bodily functions that activated throughout a dancer's Gaga practice. “Biba” means to pull the body away from the sit bones. It is meant to create more space and freedom in the lower spine. “Tashi” means to move with feet glued to the floor. “Pika” is the activation of the spot right beneath the pubic bone.

=== Focus on pleasure ===
Naharin emphasizes the return to pleasure, especially within moments of exaggeration and bodily effort. His belief is that pleasure is always good for the body. Gaga often requests demanding actions, such as running and shaking, but the effort of “burning muscles” must be tied to pleasure in order to keep it healthy. Gaga has been taught in centers for people affected by Parkinson's disease.

=== Release of aesthetic ambitions ===
The Gaga language focuses on the internal sensations. Due to this, classes are run without mirrors. Naharin emphasizes the release of ambitions or inhibitions. He states: “We might be silly, we can laugh at ourselves.” This kind of instruction aims to encourage exploratory research without limits or tensions.

=== Connection to groove ===
With or without music, dancers are asked to connect to the musicality of their movement. Naharin emphasizes attention to groove, a universal experience regardless of technique levels.

== See also ==
- Dance in Israel
