= NA-156 Vehari-I =

Constituency of the National Assembly of Pakistan

- Constituency for the National Assembly of Pakistan
- Region: Burewala Tehsil (partly) including Burewala city of Vehari District
- Electorate: 486,674

Current constituency
- Party: Sunni Ittehad Council
- Member: Ayesha Nazir Jutt
- Created from: NA-167 Vehari-I

NA-156 Vehari-I (این اے-156، وِہاڑى-1) is a constituency for the National Assembly of Pakistan.

== Election 2002 ==
General elections were held on 10 October 2002. Chaudhry Nazir Ahmad Jutt of PML-Q won by 76,217 votes.

General election 2002: NA-167 Vehari-I
Party	Candidate	Votes	%	±%
PML(Q)	Ch. Nazeer Ahmad	76,217	54.62	
PPP	Mehmood Akhtar Ghomman	54,142	38.80	
Independent	Muhammad Tahir Saleem Ch.	7,053	5.05	
Others	Others (two candidates)	2,140	1.53	
Turnout		143,845	47.08	
Total valid votes		139,552	97.02	
Rejected ballots		4,293	2.98	
Majority		22,075	15.82	
Registered electors		305,556		

== Election 2008 ==
General elections were held on 18 February 2008. Chaudhry Nazir Ahmed Jutt of PML-Q won by 65,250 votes.

General election 2008: NA-167 Vehari-I
Party	Candidate	Votes	%	±%
PML(Q)	Ch. Nazeer Ahmad	65,250	40.68	
Independent	Syed Sajid Mehdi	38,383	23.93	
PPP	Mahmood Akhtar Ghuman	33,542	20.91	
Independent	Qurban Ali Chuhan	14,754	9.20	
PML(N)	Syed Muhammad Iqbal Shah	7,684	4.79	
Others	Others (two candidates)	798	0.49	
Turnout		166,547	45.86	
Total valid votes		160,411	96.32	
Rejected ballots		6,136	3.68	
Majority		26,867	16.75	
Registered electors		363,183		
PML(Q) hold				

== By-Election 2010 ==
By-Election 2010: NA-167 Vehari-I
Party	Candidate	Votes	%	±%
PPP	Ch. Asghar Ali Jutt	74,308	48.61	
Independent	Ch. Nazir Ahmed Arain	42,606	27.87	
PML(N)	Syed Shahid Mehdi Naseem Shah	32,314	21.14	
Others	Others (eighteen candidates)	3,652	2.38	
Turnout		154,247	42.48	
Total valid votes		152,880	99.11	
Rejected ballots		1,367	0.89	
Majority		31,702	20.74	
Registered electors		363,091		
PPP gain from PML(Q)				

== Election 2013 ==
General elections were held on 11 May 2013. Chauhary Nazir Ahmed Arain of PML-N won by 99,909 votes and became the member of National Assembly.

General election 2013: NA-167 Vehari-I
Party	Candidate	Votes	%	±%
PML(N)	Ch. Nazeer Ahmad	99,907	50.23	
Independent	Ayesha Nazeer Jat	43,703	21.97	
PTI	Riasat Ali Bhatti	35,416	17.81	
Others	Others (twenty candidates)	19,868	9.99	
Turnout		206,579	62.30	
Total valid votes		198,894	96.28	
Rejected ballots		7,685	3.72	
Majority		56,204	28.26	
Registered electors		331,598		
PML(N) gain from PML(Q)				

== Election 2018 ==
General elections are scheduled to be held on 25 July 2018.

General election 2018: NA-162 Vehari-I
Party	Candidate	Votes	%	±%
PML(N)	Choudhry Faqir Ahmad	81,977	35.59	
Independent	Ayesha Nazir Jutt	64,796	28.13	
PTI	Khalid Mehmmod Chohaan	58,659	25.47	
TLP	Deewan Ghulam Farid Sajid	10,465	4.54	
Independent	Irshad Ahmed	9,241	4.01	
PPP	Kamran Yousaf Ghuman	2,711	1.18	
MMA	Shaheen Iqbal	1,697	0.74	
Pakistan Kissan Ittehad (Ch.Anwar)	Malik Zulfiqar Hussain	468	0.20	
Independent	Shagufta Chaudry	323	0.14	
Turnout		236,960	55.93	
Total valid votes		230,337	97.21	
Rejected ballots		6,623	2.79	
Majority		17,181	7.46	
Registered electors		423,613		

== Election 2024 ==
General elections were held on 8 February 2024. Ayesha Nazir Jutt won the election with 119,758 votes.

General election 2024: NA-156 Vehari-I
Party	Candidate	Votes	%	±%
PTI	Ayesha Nazir Jutt (Note: Filed nomination papers as PTI candidate but ECP allowed her to run as an Independent)	119,758	46.97	▲21.50
PML(N)	Chaudhry Nazeer Ahmad	90,065	35.33	▼0.26
TLP	Shahbaz Ahmad	18,640	7.31	▲2.77
Independent	Irshad Ahmed	13,860	5.44	▲1.43
Others	Others (seven candidates)	12,630	4.95	
Turnout		260,249	53.48	▼2.45
Total valid votes		254,953	97.97	
Rejected ballots		5,296	2.03	
Majority		29,693	11.65	
Registered electors		486,674		

== See also ==
- NA-155 Lodhran-II
- NA-157 Vehari-II
