= Natasha Sagardia =

Puerto Rican bodyboarding World Gold Medalist

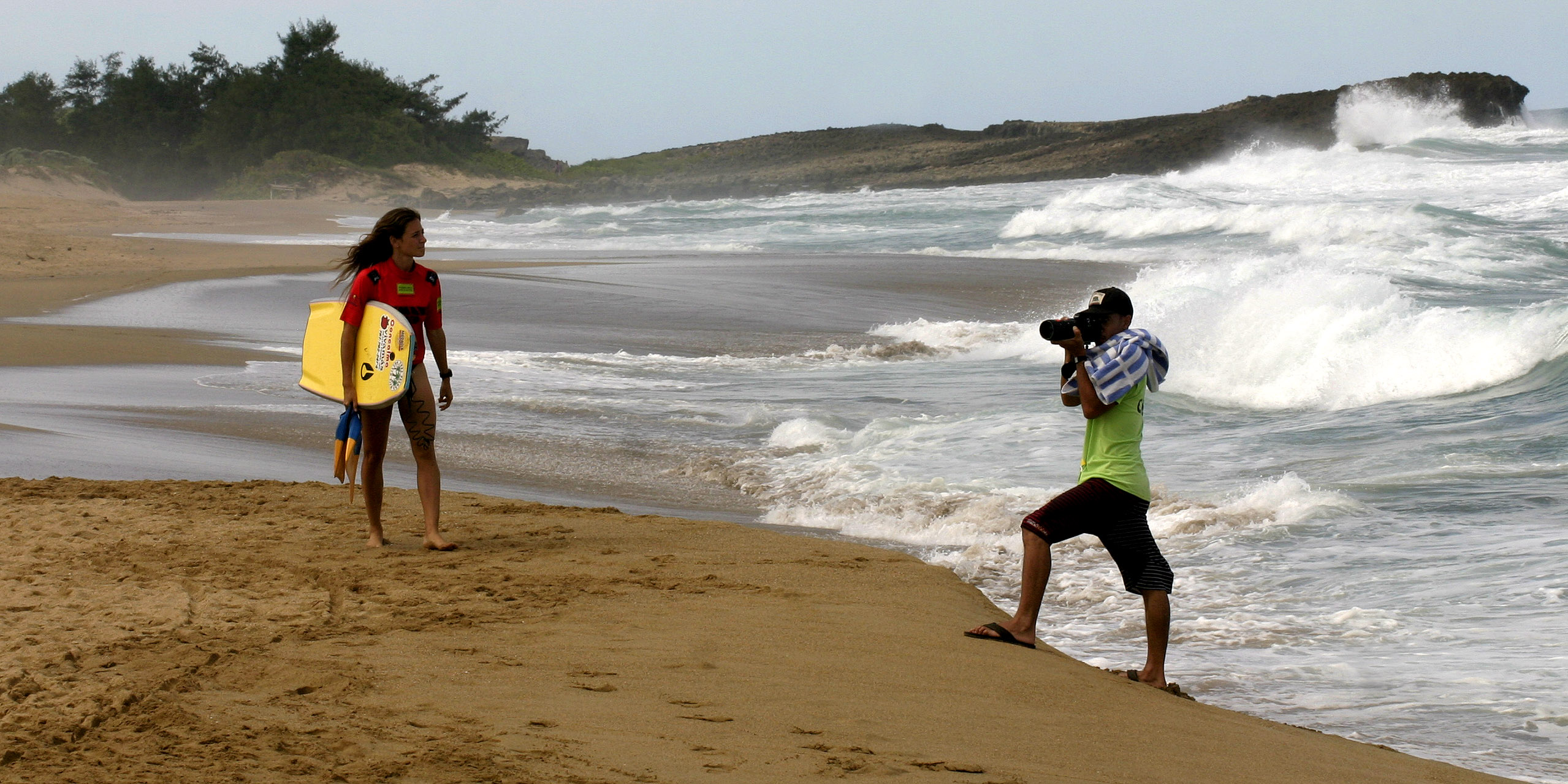
Natasha Sagardia 2012 at the IBA World Tour in Isabela, Puerto Rico

Natasha Sagardia (born 1986 in Río Cuarto, Córdoba, Argentina), is a top-ranked International Bodyboarding Association (IBA) world tour competitor and is the 2008 International Surfing Association (ISA) World Gold Medalist in the Women's Bodyboard category. Sagardia was born in Río Cuarto, Córdoba, Argentina and moved to Puerto Rico with her parents when she was nine. Sagardia entered the surfing history books, becoming the first Puerto Rican in history to win a gold medal at the ISA World Surfing Games.

In 2015, she announced her retirement from professional bodyboarding.

== See also ==
- List of Puerto Ricans
