= Oster urban hromada =

Oster urban hromada Остерська міська громада
- Hromada
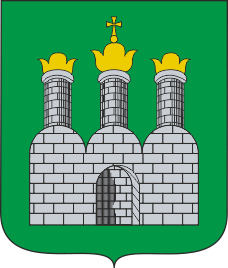
- Coat of arms
- Interactive map of Oster urban hromada
- Country: Ukraine
- Oblast: Chernihiv
- Raion: Chernihiv

Area
  - Total: 402.4 km^{2} (155.4 sq mi)

Population (2020)
  - Total: 9,017
  - Density: 22.41/km^{2} (58.04/sq mi)
- CATOTTG code: UA74100310000091595
- Settlements: 22
- Cities: 1
- Villages: 21
- Website: osterska-gromada.gov.ua

Oster urban hromada (Ukrainian: Остерська міська громада) is a hromada of Ukraine, located in Chernihiv Raion, Chernihiv Oblast. Its administrative center is the city of Oster. The territory of the Oster urban hromada is located in the south the Chernihiv Raion, within the Dnieper Lowland, on the left bank of the Desna River. It has an area of 402.4 square kilometres (155.4 mi^{2}) and a population of 9,017, as of 2020.

== Composition ==
The hromada contains 22 settlements: 1 city (Oster) and 21 villages:

- Babariki
- Beremitske
- Bilyki
- Birky
- Volevachi
- Deshki
- Yevmynka
- Zhilin Mlynok
- Zhukivshchyna
- Kotiv
- Koshany
- Kreni
- Krekhaiv
- Lyubechaniniv
- Nabilske
- Odintsi
- Parkhimiv
- Poliske
- Romanky
- Samsony
- Tumanska Huta

The settlements of the community are united into three starostyn districts: Bilykivskyi, Birkivskyi and Odintsivskyi.

== Geography ==
The territory of the Oster urban hromada is located in the south the Chernihiv Raion, borders the Kyiv Oblast. The Desna River (Dnieper basin) flows through the west of the hromada. The Oster urban hromada is located within the Dnieper Lowland. The Oster River, a left tributary of the Desna River, flows through the territory of the Oster urban hromada. The relief of the surface of the district is a lowland plain, there are many oxbow lake in the floodplains of rivers.

The climate of Oster urban hromada is moderately continental, with warm summers and relatively mild winters. The average temperature in January is about -7°C, and in July - +19°C. The average annual precipitation ranges from 550 to 660 mm, with the highest precipitation in the summer period.

The most common are sod-podzolic and gray forest soils. The Oster urban hromada is located in the natural zone of mixed forests, in Polissya. This is a transitional area between Polissya and the forest steppe. The main species in the forests are pine, oak, alder, birch. Minerals – loam, peat. The Oster urban hromada has developed forestry, vegetable and grain growing.

Regional highways pass through the hromada. There is no railway connection. The railway from Chernihiv passes through the hromada.

== See also ==
- List of hromadas of Ukraine
