= Natasha Thomas =

Natasha Thomas is the name of:

- Natasha Thomas (footballer) (born 1995), Jamaican footballer
- Natasha Thomas (singer) (born 1986), Danish singer
