= Tasha Beeds =

Canadian academic and Indigenous water protector

- Born: Saskatchewan

Academic background
- Education: University of Saskatchewan; Trent University

Tasha Beeds is a Plains Cree, Scottish-Metis and Bajan academic. She is a Mide-Kwe and a Water Walker. She was the Ron Ianni Fellow at the University of Windsor's Faculty of Law in from 2020 to 2022; she still guest lecturers for the Indigenous Legal Orders Institute. She was also the inaugural Indigenous scholar at the Anako Indigenous Research Institute at Carleton University. Of note, Tasha also has an invisible disability from a car accident where she suffered a traumatic brain injury. Instead of being impeded by the disability, she promotes seeing the challenges through the lens of Indigenous knowledges where challenges aren't necessarily given labels; instead they are seen as potential opportunities and gifts.

Beeds was born to a Cree and Scottish-Metis mother and Bajan father, and grew up in Shellbrook, Saskatchewan. She studied English and Indigenous Studies at the University of Saskatchewan. After graduation she worked as a tutor and authored education modules, eventually pursuing graduate studies in order to teach as a professor. She began her studies at USask, relocating to Trent University where she completed a master's degree in Indigenous Studies and Canadian Studies for which she received a CGS SSHRC Grant of $17,000 and a $25,000 Gabriel Dumont Institute Scholarship. She also pursued her PhD studies at Trent. As a PhD candidate, Beeds received a Joseph-Armand Bombardier Canada Graduate Scholarship to support her research on violence, Indigenous women and Cree consciousness. She joined the Indigenous studies program at the University of Sudbury in 2019 and, subsequently, lost her tenure-track position when Laurentian University restructured due to financial duress and the University of Sudbury closed the Indigenous Studies Department, one of the first in the history of the discipline .

As of March 2021, Beeds has walked about 7000 km as a way to raise awareness about the state of water systems in Canada and the United States. Her first walk, in 2011, was around Rice Lake, Ontario which led to her participation in lengthier journeys. One walk involved carrying water from the Atlantic Ocean, beginning in Matane, Quebec and ending at Madeline Island, Wisconsin. Another, which took place in 2017, began in Duluth, Minnesota and ended in Matane, Quebec where water from Lake Superior was joined with water in the St. Lawrence River. She just completed two Water Walks of her own in the summer of 2021: one for Junction Creek in the Sudbury region, where the water's flow ended at Spanish Residential School for a total of 140 km and one for the North Saskatchewan River which saw Beeds and a core team of 8 Water Walkers walk a total of 1100 km in 36 days. Beeds' mentor, Josephine-ba Mandamin, was an Anishinaabe elder known for her work as a water protector. In June, 2022, Beeds filed a lawsuit against the Health Sciences North hospital (Sudbury, Ontario) and local police, claiming damages for events in March, 2020.

== Select publications ==
- Beeds, Tasha (2016). "Rethinking Edward Ahenakew's Intellectual Legacy: Expressions of nêhiyawi-mâmitonêyihcikan (Cree Consciousness or Thinking)". In Bradford, T.; Horton, C. (eds.). Mixed blessings : indigenous encounters with Christianity in Canada. Vancouver: UBC Press. pp. 119–144. ISBN 0774829397.
- Beeds, Tasha (2014). "Remembering the Poetics of Ancient Sound: kistêsinâw/wîsahkêcâhk's maskihky (Elder Brother's Medicine)". In McLeod, Neal (ed.). Indigenous poetics in Canada. Waterloo, Ontario: Wilfrid Laurier University Press. pp. 61–72. ISBN 9781771120098.
