= Bilal Akbar Bhatti =

Pakistani politician

Member of the Provincial Assembly of the Punjab
- In office 29 May 2013 – 31 May 2018

Personal details
- Born: 24 October 1976 (age 50) Vehari, Punjab, Pakistan
- Party: TLP (2025-present)
- Other political affiliations: PMLN (2013-2025)

Bilal Akbar Bhatti is a Pakistani politician who was a Member of the Provincial Assembly of the Punjab, from May 2013 to May 2018.

== Early life and education ==
He was born on 24 October 1976 in Vehari.

He graduated in 1996 from Government College University and has a degree of Bachelor of Arts.

== Political career ==
He was elected to the Provincial Assembly of the Punjab as a candidate of Pakistan Muslim League (Nawaz) from Constituency PP-235 (Vehari-IV) in 2013 Pakistani general election.
