= Tasha Marbury =

American television personality

LaTasha Marbury (January 11, 1976) is an American reality show personality and cast member of VH1's reality series Basketball Wives. She was a member of the season 5 cast which premiered August 19, 2013.

== Personal life ==
Tasha Marbury was born and raised in Winston-Salem, NC and has lived in Purchase, NY since 1996. Raised by her mother, she has two younger siblings who both reside in North Carolina.

Marbury graduated from North Carolina State University in 1998 with a Bachelor of Science in Zoology and from Fairleigh Dickinson University in 2000 with a Bachelor of Science in nursing.

On September 14, 1999, Marbury married former NBA player Stephon Marbury in New York City. They have two children together, Xaviera Marbury and Stephon Marbury II. Tasha and Stephon finalized their divorce June 12, 2023.
