= Azeem Daultana =

Pakistani politician (1979–2012)

Azeem Khan Daultana
- Succeeded by: Nitasha Dautana (Sister)

Personal details
- Born: 4 April 1979
- Died: 10 January 2012 (aged 32)
- Political party: Pakistan Peoples Party

Azeem Daultana (Punjabi, Urdu: عظیم دولتانہ; 4 April 1979 – 10 January 2012) was a Pakistani politician from the Pakistan Peoples Party who served as a member of the National Assembly of Pakistan and parliamentary secretary for information. Daultana also served as the federal parliamentary secretary for defence.

Daultana died in a road accident near the town of Vehari in January 2012. He was a nephew of prominent politician Tehmina Daultana and also related to Mumtaz Daultana, the second Chief Minister of West Punjab in Pakistan. He died a few days before he was scheduled to be married.
