= French civil service =

The French civil service (French: Fonction publique française) is the set of civil servants (fonctionnaires) working the Government of France.

Not all employees of the state and public institutions or corporations are civil servants; however, the media often incorrectly equate "government employee" or "employee of a public corporation" with fonctionnaire. For instance, most employees of the RATP and SNCF (metropolitan and national rail transport authorities) are not civil servants. The Civil Service is also sometimes incorrectly referred to as the administration, but, properly speaking, the administration is the compound of public administrations and public administrative establishments, not their employees.

Most employment positions in the French civil service are open to citizens of the European Union. Others, especially in police and justice, are specifically reserved for nationals, while a minority are open regardless of citizenship. About half of the civil servants are employed in the French public education system.

== Corps and grades ==
The Civil Service is divided into:

- the civil service of the State (fonction publique de l'État);
- the judiciary (magistrature);
- the civil service of public hospitals (fonction publique hospitalière);
- the civil service of local governments (fonction publique territoriale).

Technically, fonction publique may also refer to fonction publique militaire, the personnel of military status. They are generally counted apart. There also exist ouvriers d'État (State Workers) - that is, blue collar workers - for industrial functions.

=== Corps ===
Civil servants of the State are divided into corps ("professions"). Corps are grouped in 3 categories (formerly 4): category A for management, design, and general studies professions (e.g. judges, engineers, professors...); category B for applications-related professions (e.g. librarians, superior technicians...); and category C for executions-related professions (e.g. technicians, administrative assistants...). Each corps has a set of possible job or task descriptions and may have its own particular statutes. The categories A, B and C are hierarchical classifications based on the level of responsibility, education and remuneration of civil servants. Category A (minimum college level) concerns design and management functions; category B (university entrance qualificationl) applies to application and drafting functions, and category C (high school level) applies to implementation functions. Other French Civil Services have different organisations; for instance the Territorial Civil Service (Fonction Publique Territoriale) is not divided between rigid "corps" but between "cadre d'emplois" (lit. employment framework). In the French Armed Forces, commissioned officers belong to category A, non-commissioned officers to category B, and troops to category C.

Category A (Advanced Level)

- Functions: Design, management, supervision.
- Required qualification: Minimum 3-year post-secondary education (minimum Bachelor's degree). In 2023, 64% of those recruited had a master's or higher degree.
- Examples: Engineers of Bridges, Waters and Forests, Agricultural and Environmental Engineers, Technical Staff of the National Forestry Office, Hospital Practitioners, General Care Nurses, Police Commissioners, Police Commanders.

Category B (Intermediate Level)

- Functions: Application, drafting, and middle management.
- Required qualification: Minimum Baccalauréat, sometimes Associate degree. In 2023, 48% of those recruited had a Baccalauréat, 49% a higher degree.
- Examples: Senior Forestry Technicians, Hospital Nursing Assistants, Police Officers.

Category C (Basic Level)

- Functions: Implementation, mastery of a specific trade.
- Required qualification: CAP (vocational certificate), BEP (advanced vocational certificate), or secondary school diploma, or no formal qualification.In 2023, 49% of those recruited held a Baccalauréat, 28% a higher degree.
- Examples: Ambulance Drivers, State Technical Assistants, Administrative Assistants of the National Police.

=== Grades ===
These corps may themselves be divided into ranks (grades, called classes in certain corps). For instance, the corps of university professors is a category A corps divided into 3 classes: second class (equivalent to an American associate professor), first class (full professor), exceptional class (leading full professor in their area). Generally, to avoid rank inflation, the number of civil servants in the higher ranks (especially "exceptional class") is constrained by a maximal percentage of the total number of civil servants of the corps.

- Category A. Engineers of Bridges, Waters and Forests: General Engineer, Exceptional Class; General Engineer, Normal Class; Chief Engineer; Engineer; Student Engineer.
- Category B. Hospital Nursing Assistants: Nursing Assistant, Higher Class; Nursing Assistant, Normal Class.
- Category C. Administrative Assistants of the National Police: Senior Administrative Assistant, 1st Class; Senior Administrative Assistant, 2nd Class; Administrative Assistant, 1st Class.

==== Grands corps de l'État ====
Certain corps enjoying particular prestige are called the "grands corps de l'État" (lit. major state corps)

- Grand Technical Corps of the State, consisting of engineers, generally recruited at École polytechnique (also at the écoles normales supérieures). In practice, they are more likely to be employed in executive positions than in purely technical positions.
  - Corps des mines (Mine Corps), merged with the Corps of Telecommunications in 2009
  - Corps des ponts, waters and forests (des eaux et des forêts; IPEF)
  - Corps des télécommunications (Telecommunications Corps), merged into the Corps des mines in 2009
  - Corps de l'armement (Armaments Corps)
  - Corps de l'INSEE
  - Administrators of the Parliamentary Assemblies (administrateurs des assemblées), which also includes the Administrators of the National Assembly (administrateur de l'Assemblée nationale) and the Administrators of the Senate (administrateur du Sénat).
- Grand Administrative Corps of the State, generally recruited through the National Institute of Public Service (INSP).
  - Conseil d'État (lit. Council of State)
  - Inspection générale des finances. (lit. Inspectorate-General of Finances)
  - Cour des comptes (lit. Court of Auditors)

High-level administrative positions are typically paid much less than the equivalent positions in private industries. However, members of grand Corps often practice pantouflage — that is, they take temporarily (and sometimes permanent) leave from government work and go work in industry. Occasionally, people from a ministry supervising some industry would later go to work in that same industry; this practice was later prohibited. Pantouflage however still exists, and the coziness between some industrial, political and administrative circles is regularly denounced.

Members of the great administrative corps are well represented in politics. This is facilitated by civil servants (of any level) being able to exercise elected office on a temporary leave (détachement) from government.

== Duties ==
Civil servants have duties; failure to carry them out may result in disciplinary action, up to discharge. The main duties are:

=== Full commitment to professional activity ===
A civil servant should devote their full professional activity to their appointed task. By exception, a civil servant may in addition to their regular activities write books; they may also accomplish certain tasks (teaching...) with the permission of their hierarchical supervisor.

=== Morality ===
One cannot be a civil servant if one has been convicted of a crime incompatible with one's functions.

In certain exceptional cases, certain aspects of the private life of a civil servant may be termed incompatible with their functions. For instance, it is inappropriate for a member of the police or the judiciary to live with a delinquent partner or a prostitute. Appreciation of what is appropriate or not is largely a matter of case law.

=== Reserve ===
A civil servant should not, by their actions and especially by their declarations, cause harm to institutions.

Generally speaking, a civil servant should always refrain from enunciating personal opinions in a manner that can be construed as expressing the official opinion of the French government or a public institution. Obviously, this is more of a matter for the higher managerial positions. Agents operating abroad should be especially prudent. For instance, an ambassador should refrain from making any private comment on international issues.

The academic freedom of university professors is a principle recognized (in theory) by the laws of the Republic, as defined by the Constitutional Council; furthermore, statute law declares about higher education that "teachers-researchers [university professors and lecturers], researchers and teachers are fully independent and enjoy full freedom of speech in the course of their research and teaching activities, provided they respect, following university traditions and the dispositions of this code, principles of tolerance and objectivity".

=== Hierarchical obedience ===
A civil servant must accomplish the orders given by their hierarchical supervisor, unless those orders are evidently illegal and contrary to public interest.

While the hierarchical authority is normally responsible for assigning civil servants to positions and evaluating their work, certain corps of civil servants follow specific rules regarding the management, evaluation and discipline of their members. For instance, professors and researchers are evaluated by elected committees of their peers. Furthermore, judges of the judiciary (magistrats du siège) as well as administrative magistrates cannot be removed from their position, even for a promotion, without their agreement.

=== Professional discretion ===
Civil servants must not reveal private or secret information that they have gained in the course of their duties. Depending on a civil servant's corps, this obligation may be of varying intensity : while administrative magistrates are formally discouraged from making their profession in non-professional works and opinions, members of the military are expected to maintain a very high standard of discretion. This restraint on the side of the military has even led it to being nicknamed "the great mute" ("la grande muette").

=== Honesty ===
Civil servants must not use the means at their professional disposal for private gain.

=== Neutrality ===
Civil servant must be neutral with respect to the religious or political opinions, origin, or sex, and should refrain from expressing their own opinions.

== Recruitment and career ==
Most positions are open to citizens of the European Union. Certain positions involving the main powers of the state (e.g. Police) are open only to French nationals. Some rare positions, e.g. university professors and researchers, are open regardless of citizenship.

As an exception to the general rules concerning workers, civil servants do not sign contracts; their situation is defined by statutory and regulatory dispositions, most notably the General Statute of the Civil Servants (Statut Général des Fonctionnaires).

The general rule is that civil servants are recruited through competitive exams, either:

- external, reserved to competitors fulfilling certain conditions of diplomas and age;
- internal, reserved to civil servants in certain positions;
- external, reserved to competitors having certain professional experience and age.

The most common method is to organize written and/or oral exams in subjects pertaining to the tasks to be accomplished. For certain positions, such as professorships in universities, the exam, organized locally for each position or each set of similar positions, consists in the submission of a file listing the professional qualifications and experience of the candidate, followed by an interview. In all cases, a committee ranks candidates by order of preference; the positions are filled by the candidates accepting them called in that order of preference. For some top managerial positions, nominations are at the discretion of the executive.

High level nominations are made by the President of the Republic in the council of ministers. The rest are by the head of the agency they belong to, or by a minister; in fact, they are in general appointed by some person who has received from the head of agency or minister the authority to do so.

== Pay ==
The pay of a civil servant is composed of:

- a base pay known as traitement
- possible overtime pay
- possible bonuses, which depend on the particular job assignment and possibly of the individual worker.

The traitement is for most civil servants fixed by multiplying an index by the value of the index point in Euros. The value of the index point is set by the executive and is raised regularly to compensate for inflation. The index depends on the corps, rank and seniority in rank (échelon).

In the case of high-level civil servants known as hors échelle, the corps, rank and seniority correspond to a letter code (e.g. A1, E2, G); the corresponding yearly pay can then be looked up in tables set by the executive. For instance, the topmost traitement, corresponding to pay grade G, is €82737.67 per year, starting 1 July 2009.

There are special rules for the pays of elected officials and government ministers.

== Statistics ==
On 31 December 1999, official statistics give for the state civil service:

Ministries	Civil servants	Ouvriers EVY	Other civilian employees	Military personnel	Total
Foreign affairs	7,159	150	6,767	974	15,050
Agriculture	29,724	34	8,316	23	38,097
Veteran affairs	1,934	76	337	20	2,367
Cooperation with foreign countries	1,851		1,660	585	4,096
Culture	12,212		2,532		14,744
Defense	33,324	49,763	7,979	318,057	409,123
Economy, finances and industry	187,728	739	16,005	348	204,820
National education	942,651		96,487	4	1,039,142
Employment and solidarity	22,928		7,158	22	30,108
Higher education	117,411	8	17,088		134,507
Equipment, housing, transportation	95,797	9,508	11,359	547	117,211
Interior (including police)	161,978	1,593	20,410 (1)	34	184,015
Youth and sports	6,411		4,093		10,504
Justice	61,232		4,764	2	65,998
Overseas affairs	2,171		468	865	3,504
Research	20		9,041		9,061
Services of the prime minister	1,367	666	1,127		3,160
Total	1,685,898	62,537	215,591	321,481	2,285,507

(1) Including 12,000 young employees on limited time contracts.

== See also ==
- Academic ranks in France
- Category:French civil servants
