= Luc Rémont =

French businessman (born 1969)

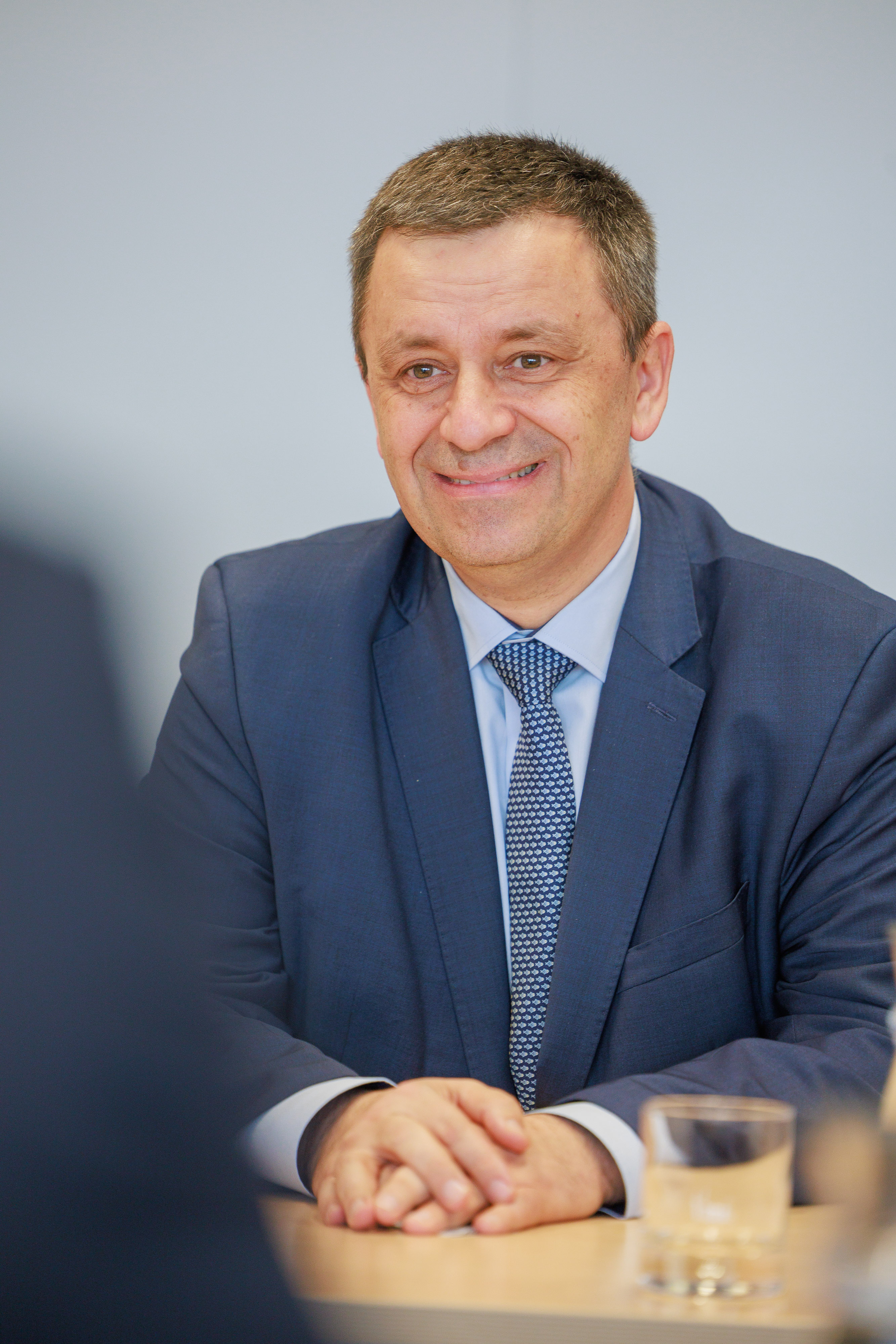
- Luc Rémont in 2024
- Born: 7 September 1969 (age 57); Nancy, France
- Education: Lycée Sainte-Geneviève
- Alma mater: École polytechnique ENSTA
- Occupation: CEO of EDF (2022-present)
- Children: 4

Luc Rémont (born 7 September 1969) is a French business leader, former senior civil servant and former investment banker. After serving as a ministerial advisor under President Jacques Chirac, he moved into the private sector, holding senior positions with the investment bank Bank of America Merrill Lynch, Schneider Electric and then Gimélec. The French government announced his appointment as chairman and CEO of EDF on September 29, 2022, which was validated by Parliament on October 26, 2022, and formalized by the Council of Ministers on November 23, 2022.

== Biography ==
His father Bruno Rémont was mayor (UDF, then UMP) of Saint-Cyr-au-Mont-d'Or for 25 years (from March 1983 to March 2008). His mother was a psychiatrist at the Saint-Cyr-au-Mont-d'Or hospital.

He was accepted at the École Polytechnique in 1988, graduating in 1991. He then joined the Corps des Ingénieurs de l'Armement and graduated from ENSTA. He also obtained a DEA in pattern recognition from the University of Paris IV.

He began his career in 1993 as a military engineer.

In 1996, he was assigned to the Treasury Department of the French Ministry of the Economy and Finance. He is initially responsible for relations with development banks such as the EBRD and the World Bank. He then worked in the administrative department managing the French government's shareholdings in the transport sector.

From 2002 to 2007, he worked in the cabinets of successive Ministers of the Economy and Finance: Francis Mer, Nicolas Sarkozy and Thierry Breton. Il working on EDF's IPO in 2005 and the privatization of ADP and Areva.

He joined the private sector in 2007. At Bank of America Merrill Lynch, he was appointed Head of Corporate and Investment Banking in France in 2009, as well as Head of the Benelux subsidiary, until July 2014.

In this capacity, he oversaw the sale of Alstom Energie to the American company General Electric.

He worked at Schneider Electric, where he headed up operations in France until April 1, 2017. He was replaced in this position by Christel Heydemann. He was then appointed General Manager, International Operations.

He was also elected Chairman of Gimélec from April 2015 to May 2018, when Christel Heydemann succeeded him in this role.

In September 2022, the French government is considering appointing him to replace Jean-Bernard Lévy at the head of EDF, with a possible separation of the functions of chairman and chief executive officer.

Luc Rémont was thus preferred to the other candidates Philippe Knoche and Marianne Laigneau. Marianne Laigneau had at one time been considered for the position of non-executive Chairman of EDF, in the event of the chairman's position being separated from that of chief executive officer.

In the end, the French government decided in favor of a single governance structure and officially appointed Luc Rémont as CEO of EDF in November 2022.

His annual salary is limited to 450,000 Euros.

In January 2024, Cameroonian nationals filed a complaint before the Nanterre court, Luc Rémont and eleven French people involved in the construction of the Nachtigal dam (420 MW) were accused of having failed in their duty of vigilance and their obligation to assist people in danger. After an accident that occurred on August 30, 2023, on this site caused the disappearance of two employees.

He is described as being close to Alexis Kohler, the Élysée general secretary, but also to Joël Barre, the system architect of the future EPR2 reactors to be built by EDF.

== EDF ==
He takes over the reins of the state-owned company at a time when EDF is going through a particularly difficult period, due in particular to the operational difficulties encountered with its nuclear fleet. In his roadmap, the government has asked him to focus on three key areas: restoring EDF's production to "best international comparables", controlling details and budgets for ongoing nuclear projects, and turning around the group's financial trajectory "over the long term".

== Family ==
He has 4 children. His wife Sophie, a graduate of the Ecole Normale Supérieure and a mining engineer, works at Bpifrance.
