= Library curator =

A library curator (French: conservateur des bibliothèques) is a senior civil servant in the French civil service, responsible for the management and supervision of state or local government libraries. This corps (or cadre d'emplois in the case of local government) comprises two grades: "curator" (conservateur) and "chief curator" (conservateur en chef). State curators can be promoted to a higher corps as a general library curator (conservateur général des bibliothèques) within the state civil service. Curators are recruited through competitive examinations and undergo a period of paid training.

== Status ==
The corps of library curators (state civil service) is governed by decree No. 92-26 of 9 January 1992, as amended by decree No. 2001-946 of 11 October 2001, decree No. 2007-653 of 30 April 2007, decree No. 2010-966 of 26 August 2010, decree No. 2017-144 of 7 February 2017, and decree No. 2017-852 of 6 May 2017. This is the scientific staff corps for libraries, belonging to Category A of the civil service. It is an interministerial corps under the authority of the Ministry of Higher Education and Research.

The employment group (cadre d'emplois) for library curators (local government civil service) is governed by decree No. 91-841 of 2 September 1991, which has been amended several times. The employment framework has similar characteristics to its state counterpart.

=== Recruitment ===
Curators are recruited through competitive examinations, organized by the Ministry of Higher Education and Research for state curators and by the CNFPT for local government curators.

Entry into this training requires passing a recruitment examination, which can be:

- an external examination, open to holders of a level 6 diploma on the RNCP;
- an examination open to former students of the École Nationale des Chartes;
- an external examination open to holders of a national doctoral degree;
- an internal examination open to civil servants.

All successful candidates undergo 18 months of paid training. The training for state curators includes a three-month internship. At the Institut national des études territoriales in Strasbourg, local government curator trainees must complete five internships, lasting between 3 weeks and 3 months.

There is therefore no longer a shared training path for state and local government curators. During this training period, the successful candidates are paid trainee curators.

The library curator diploma does not grant a specific RNCP level.

=== Career progression ===
In addition, librarians who meet certain age and seniority conditions can be promoted to curator without an examination. The new state curators follow a six-month adaptation training at the École nationale supérieure des sciences de l'information et des bibliothèques (ENSSIB).

In the local government civil service, this curator corps includes two successive grades:

- Curator (2 trainee pay grades then 7 regular pay grades);
- Chief Curator (6 pay grades).

Some curators who have reached the grade of chief curator can change corps to be promoted to general library curator. This is a single-grade corps, comprising 4 pay grades. This corps only exists in the state civil service; there is no corresponding employment framework in the local government civil service.

== Mission ==
Members of the library curator corps form the senior management of libraries. They are responsible for supervising teams, managing services and budgets, and directing the libraries under their charge.

According to the decrees, they build, organize, enrich, evaluate, and utilize the library collections of all kinds. They are responsible for this heritage. They organize public access to the collections and the dissemination of documents for research, information, or cultural purposes. The collection catalogs are created under their responsibility. They may participate in the training of professionals and the public in the fields of libraries and documentation, as well as in scientific and technical information in these same areas. Chief curators assume special responsibilities due to the importance of the collections or the scientific or administrative missions entrusted to them. They may be assigned management and coordination functions as well as study and advisory roles involving special responsibilities.

A number of local government libraries (municipal libraries, departmental libraries) also employ curators.

State curators who have reached the grade of chief curator, as well as general curators, can be appointed to the corps of the General Inspectorate of Education, Sport, and Research (there are no more than ten positions).

== History ==
For a long time, the title of "curator" (conservateur) was only recognized for certain positions in French libraries, while other individuals held the title of "librarian" (bibliothécaire) or "chief librarian" (bibliothécaire en chef).

In 1952, decree No. 52-554 of 16 May organized a corps of librarians, in which the highest grades were named "curator" and "chief curator." Following the statutory reform introduced by decree No. 69-1265 of 31 December 1969, two scientific staff corps were established: a corps of curators comprising three grades (2nd class curator, 1st class curator, and chief curator), and a corps of general inspectors of libraries.

The reform of January 1992 maintained the corps of curators but created a corps of general curators above it and another Category A corps of "librarians" below it. The corps of general inspectors was phased out, and inspection missions were carried out by chief curators and, primarily, by general curators.

From 1991 (1992 for state curators) to 2010, the curator career comprised three grades: 2nd class curator, 1st class curator, and chief curator. The 2010 reforms (the one in January for local government, in August for the state) merged the grades of 2nd class and 1st class curator.

== See also ==
- Librarian

== Sources ==
- Marcerou-Ramel, Nathalie (3 April 2020). "The Initial Training of Librarians and Curators in France: A National Mission". Bibliothek Forschung und Praxis. 44 (1): 72–79. doi:10.1515/bfp-2020-0001. ISSN 1865-7648.
