= Corps de l'armement =

Corps des ingénieurs de l'armement
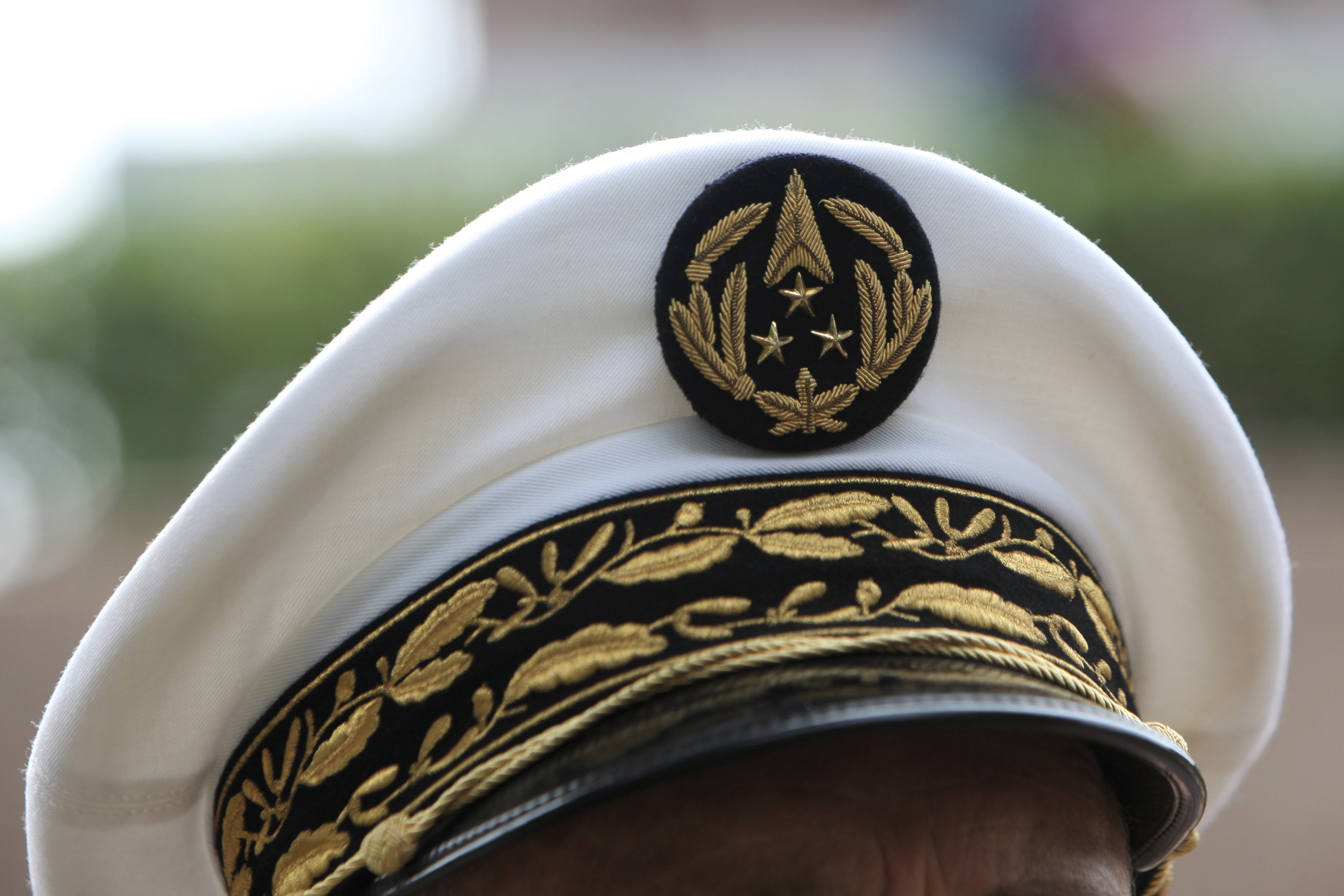
- Hat of an Engineer-General, First Class.
- Active: 1968–present
- Country: France
- Branch: Aerospace & Defence
- Type: Corps of military engineers
- Role: Management of Aerospace & Defence Programmes, Research & Testing
- Size: 2000

The Corps des ingénieurs de l'armement (French pronunciation: [kɔʁ de ɛ̃ʒenjœʁ də laʁməmɑ̃]) ([kɔʁ dez‿ɛ̃ʒenjœʁ də laʁməmɑ̃]) is a Technical Grand Corps of the French State (grand corps de l'Etat [ɡʁɑ̃ kɔʁ də leta]), aimed at providing the French Armed Forces with all appropriate equipment and supervising the French Aerospace & Defence industry.

The corps members are the ingénieurs de l'armement ([ɛ̃ʒenjœʁ də laʁməmɑ̃]) nicknamed IA in French. They are high level engineers and public servants with military status, originating for most of them (more than 2/3 by decree) from Ecole polytechnique and trained at Institut supérieur de l'aéronautique et de l'espace (ISAE) (formation SUPAERO), ENSTA Paris, or other French or international universities.

The Corps des ingénieurs de l'armement's main employer (50%) is the Direction générale de l'armement (General Directorate for Armament). The second half are employed in other bodies of the Ministry of Defence, in international Defence organizations (NATO, OCCAR,...), can be detached in French administrative bodies (CNES, CEA, ESA,...), or the French and European industry (EADS, Safran, Thales Group, MBDA, DCNS...).

== Prehistory of the Corps des ingénieurs de l'armement ==
The Corps was created in 1968 as a fusion of previous Corps of military engineers recruiting at Ecole polytechnique.

- Corps of Aeronautics engineers (corps des ingénieurs de l'air - or de l'aéronautique)
- Corps of naval engineers (corps du génie maritime)
- Corps of Powders and Explosives engineers (corps des ingénieurs des poudres et explosifs)
- Corps of Military Telecom engineers (corps des ingénieurs des télécom militaires)
- Corps of Armament Fabrications engineers (corps des ingénieurs des fabrications d'armement)

In 1743, the "Ecole des constructeurs de vaisseaux royaux" was created to train Naval engineers. The school is known today as ENSTA ParisTech.

== Corps of Armament and high-tech Colbertism ==
The role played by the Corps of Armament in the development of the French aerospace and defence industry, in particular with the logic of Grands Projets (Concorde, Airbus, Ariane,...), can be compared with the role of the Corps des télécommunications in the development of the French telecom industry (telephone, Minitel,...), the role of the Corps des mines, or the Corps des ponts with their respective Grands Projets (Nuclear industry, TGV,...). They illustrate Colbertism, a French version of mercantilism.

Colbertism dates back to the 17th century, influenced at that time by the Chinese system. French high public servants are nicknamed "mandarins", referring to their Chinese counterparts.

The French economist Elie Cohen described the effects of French Colbertism in the field of High tech in a book entitled "High tech Colbertism - Economics of the Grand Projet" (1995).

High tech Colbertism can be characterized by a prevalent role played in France by the Administration and the Grand Corps. A typical Colbertist mechanism is the "pantouflage" where top civil servants become Heads of French public companies. The word "pantouflage" cannot be directly translated in English nor in any Western language but can be translated in Japanese where a comparable mechanism exists. The Japanese word is "amakudari" ("fallen from the sky").

== Notable members of the Corps des ingénieurs de l'armement ==
=== Heads of the Direction générale de l'armement ===
- Henri Martre, délégué général pour l'armement (1977-1983), CEO Aérospatiale (1983-1992).
- Yves Sillard, Director general of CNES (1976-1982), CEO IFREMER (1982-1989), délégué général pour l'armement (1989-1993).

=== Heads of other public bodies ===
- Frédéric van Roekeghem, director of the French national health insurance fund.
- Pierre-Henri Gourgeon, former directeur général de l'aviation civile and Directeur général d'Air France.
- Alain Bugat, headed the Commissariat à l'énergie atomique (2003-2009).
- Guillaume Poupard, CEO of the French National Cybersecurity Agency.

=== Top industrialists ===
- Jean-Paul Herteman, CEO Safran, Chairman of GIFAS, Vice Chairman of Conseil général de l'armement.
- Marwan Lahoud, Head of EADS France, former CEO of MBDA.
- Henri Martre, Délégué général pour l'armement (1977-1983), CEO Aérospatiale (1983-1992).
- Serge Tchuruk, president of Total, then Alcatel Lucent.

=== Aerospace engineers ===
- René Audran, Director of International Affairs at DGA, assassinated by Action directe in 1985.
- Jean-Marie Bastien-Thiry, famous for attempting to assassinate French president Charles de Gaulle in 1962.
- Roger Béteille, one of the founders of Airbus.
- Jean-François Clervoy, astronaut.
- François Hussenot, credited with the invention of one of the early forms of the flight data recorder.
- Henri Ziegler, one of the founders of Airbus.

=== Naval, nuclear & telecom engineers ===
- Louis-Émile Bertin, naval engineer.
- Nicolas Léonard Sadi Carnot, physicist described as the father of thermodynamics.
- Raymond Adolphe Séré de Rivières, fortification engineer and general.

== Grades ==
NATO rank	Rank insignia		Grade		Notes
NATO rank	Ingénieurs de l'armement	Ingénieurs des études et techniques de l'armement (Note: Armament Design and Technology Engineers)	French	English translation	Notes
OF-9			Ingénieur général de classe exceptionnelle	Engineer general exceptional class	
OF-8			Ingénieur général hors classe	Engineer general special class	
OF-7			Ingénieur général de première classe	Engineer general first class	
OF-6			Ingénieur général de deuxième classe	Engineer general second class	
OF-5			Ingénieur en chef (Armament Engineers) Ingénieur en chef de 1re classe (Armament Design and Technology Engineers)	Chief engineer Chief engineer 1st class	With more than two years in grade for Armament Engineers
OF-4			Ingénieur en chef (Armament Engineers) Ingénieur en chef de 2e classe (Armament Design and Technology Engineers)	Chief engineer Chief engineer 2nd class	With less than two years in grade for Armament Engineers
OF-3			Ingénieur principal	Principal engineer	
OF-2			Ingénieur	Engineer	4th to 9th level for Armament Engineers 6th to 10th level for Armament Design and Technology Engineers
OF-1			Ingénieur	Engineer	2nd and 3rd level f 3rd year at ENSTA for Armament Design and Technology Engineers
OF-1			Ingénieur	Engineer	1st level for Armament Engineers Second year at ENSTA for Armament Design and Technology Engineers
OF-D	n/a		Aspirant	Aspirant	During the preliminary year of training at the armed forces and during the first year at ENSTA Bretagne or ENSTA Paris for Armament Design and Technology Engineers.

== See also ==
- Direction générale de l'armement
- Grands corps de l'Etat
- Corps des mines
- Corps des ponts
- Corps des télécommunications
- Corps de l'INSEE
- Colbertism
- High tech Colbertism
- Mercantilism
