= COMETA report =

1999 French UFO sighting report

The COMETA report is an unofficial 1999 report published by the French association COMETA (Comité d'Études Approfondies) on unidentified aerospace phenomena (UAP), commonly known as unidentified flying objects (UFOs). The report was titled UFOs and Defense: What Should We Prepare For? and an archive was made public in 2007 by GEIPAN, the French unit responsible for researching and investigating unidentified aerospace phenomena (UAPs).

== COMETA association ==
COMETA (abbreviation of the COMité d'Etudes Approfondies) was a non-profit association formed in 1999 by a group of individuals, including defense experts, with the aim of raising awareness about the UFO phenomenon among authorities and the public. It was chaired by retired French Air Force General Denis Letty.

After operating informally since 1996, COMETA was officially registered as a non-profit association under the French law of 1901 on February 24, 1999. COMETA association became dormant around 2006 after the report's publication. The report itself was not widely circulated due to copyright restrictions.

== Report details ==
In 1999, after three years of work by a "private committee" led by General Letty, COMETA member Jean-Jacques Velasco personally handed an unofficial 90-page document titled "COMETA Report" to Lionel Jospin, who was the prime minister of France at the time. This was not an officially commissioned government report.

The report was divided into three parts with a conclusion. It compiled case studies of French and foreign UAP/UFO incidents investigated over a period of about 60 years, with a focus on aspects related to national defense.

== Contributors and collaborators ==
Contributors to the COMETA report included:

- Jean-Jacques Velasco (former director of CNES's GEPAN and SEPRA UAP study groups)
- General Domange of the French Air Force
- Edmond Campagnac, former technical director of Air France
- Professor André Lebeau (preface), former president of CNES (French space agency)
- General Bernard Norlain (preface), former director of IHEDN (Institute of Higher National Defense Studies)

== Findings ==
The authors of the COMETA report concluded that there was an "almost certain physical reality" of completely unknown flying objects displaying extraordinary capabilities that current science could not explain. They stated that based on the documented performance of UFOs, especially in cases with radar data, the extraterrestrial hypothesis appeared to be the most "probable" or "credible" explanation, though not scientifically proven. The report clearly differentiated between the reality of UFO phenomena and the notion of extraterrestrial visitors, which it said remained a hypothesis.

== Reactions ==
The COMETA report received media attention in France and abroad when it was published. However, reactions were mixed, with skeptics criticizing its credibility while some UFO researchers had varied opinions about its conclusions.

According to Olivier Schrameck, who was chief of staff to Lionel Jospin, the French prime minister, read and annotated the COMETA report "to mark his interest" upon receiving it. The French government did not make any official response beyond Jospin's reported interest.
