= Jean-François Clervoy =

French astronaut and engineer (born 1958)

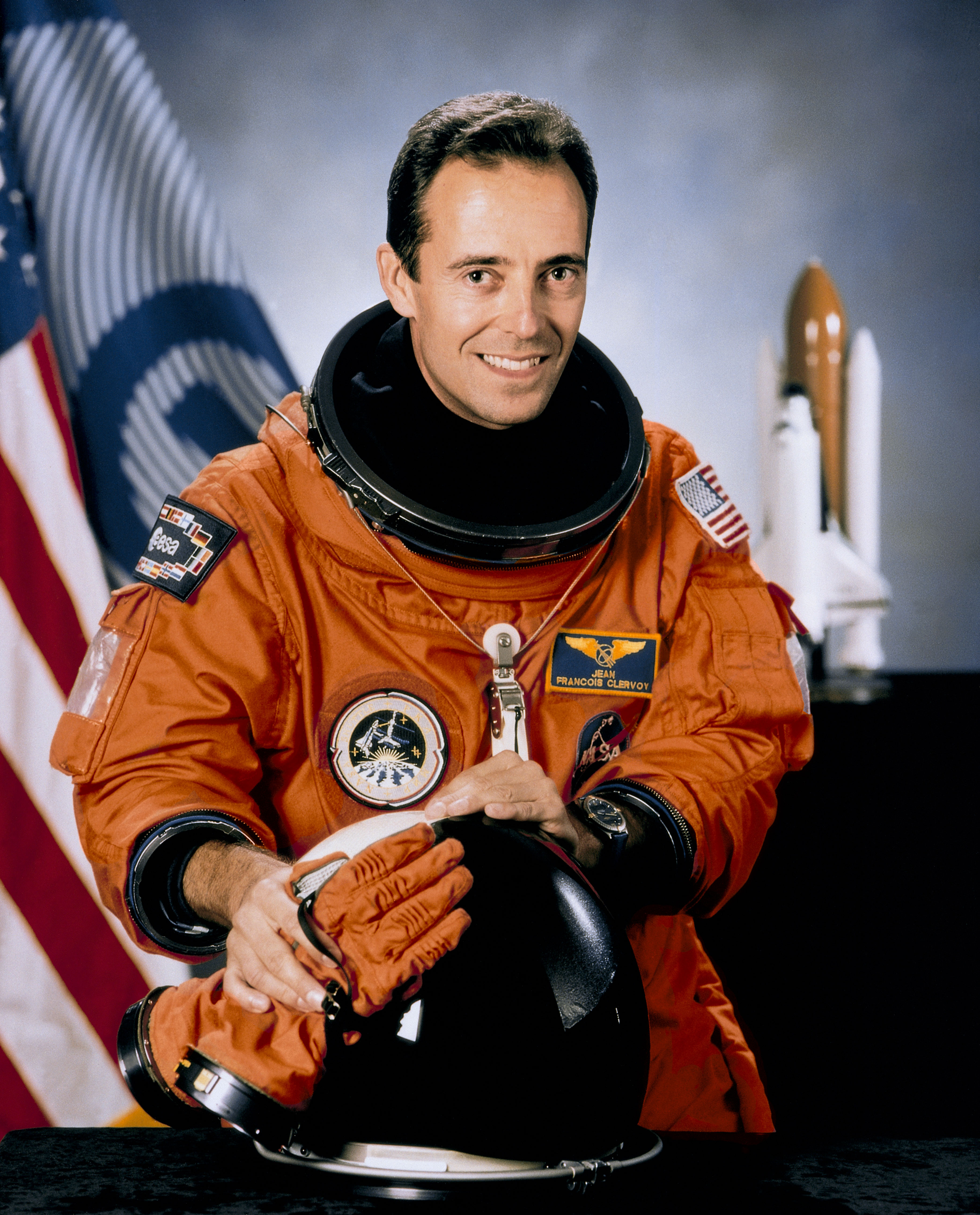
- Born: 19 November 1958 (age 67); Longeville-lès-Metz, France
- Occupations: Senior astronaut of the European Astronaut Center and Novespace Chairman
- Spouse: Laurence Boulanger
- Children: 2
- Space career

CNES/ESA astronaut
- Status: Retired
- Rank: Ingénieur Général de 2^{e} classe (Brigadier General, Corps of Ordnance Engineers)
- Time in space: 28d 03h 05min
- Selection: 1985 CNES Group 2, 1992 ESA Group, 1992 NASA Group 14
- Missions: STS-66, STS-84, STS-103

Jean-François André Clervoy (French pronunciation: [ʒɑ̃ fʁɑ̃swa ɑ̃dʁe klɛʁvwa]; born 19 November 1958) is a French engineer and a CNES and ESA astronaut. He is a veteran of three NASA Space Shuttle missions.

== Early life and education ==
Clervoy was born 19 November 1958 in Longeville-lès-Metz, France, the son of Mireille Lemonde and Jean Clervoy, a former French Air Force pilot.

From an early age, he took an interest in space exploration and dreamt of becoming an astronaut:

When I was in second grade, Clervoy says, my teacher used to tell us that when we would be grown up, we would be able to fly in space, the same way he was able to buy a ticket to go to the United States.

While born in the French region of Lorraine, Clervoy considers Toulouse to be his adopted hometown. He has a twin brother, Patrick Clervoy, a military psychiatrist.

He received his baccalauréat from Collège Militaire de Saint-Cyr-l'École in 1976; he passed Math. Sup. and Math. Spé. M' at Prytanée Militaire, La Flèche in 1978. He graduated from École Polytechnique, Paris, in 1981. He then became a member of the Corps of Armament. He graduated from École nationale supérieure de l'aéronautique et de l'espace, Toulouse, in 1983; he graduated as a Flight Test Engineer from École du personnel navigant d'essais et de réception, Istres, in 1987.

== Experience ==
In 1983 Clervoy was seconded from the Direction générale de l'armement (DGA) to CNES (French Space Agency) where he works on autopilot systems for various projects such as the earth observation satellite SPOT, the optical inter-satellite space link STAR, or the comet probe VEGA. Clervoy is Ingénieur Général de l'Armement in the Corps of Armament at the DGA.

He was selected in the second group of French astronauts in 1985 and started intensive Russian language training. From 1987 until 1992 he directed the parabolic flight program at the Flight Test Center, Brétigny-sur-Orge and provided technical support to the European human space program within the ESA Hermes crew office in Toulouse. From 1983 to 1987, Clervoy was also a lecturer in signal processing and general mechanics at the École nationale supérieure de l'aéronautique et de l'espace, Toulouse.

In 1991, he trained in Star City, Moscow, on the Soyuz and Mir systems. In 1992, he joined the Astronaut Corps of the European Space Agency (ESA) at the European Astronaut Center EAC in Cologne. In August 1992 Clervoy was detached to the NASA Johnson Space Center/ Houston to gain the Space Shuttle mission specialist qualifications. In between his space flights, Clervoy was assigned as flight software verification lead in the Shuttle Avionics Integration Laboratory (SAIL) and as robotics display design lead for Shuttle and ISS. After his third spaceflight, he was assigned as the International Space Station display integration lead in the NASA-JSC Astronaut Office.

He flew twice aboard Space Shuttle Atlantis and once aboard Discovery or a total of 675 hours in space. Due to the difficulty that American astronauts had in pronouncing his name, Clervoy was nicknamed "Billy Bob."

From 2001 through 2008, he was assigned Senior Advisor Astronaut of the Automated Transfer Vehicle ESA project in Les Mureaux (France). In 2008, he was also appointed member of the selection board for the new ESA astronaut class.

Clervoy holds military and civilian parachuting licenses, military and civilian scuba-diving licenses, and private pilot license.

== Spaceflight experience ==
- STS-66 (November 3 –14, 1994), the Atmospheric Laboratory for Applications and Science-3 (ATLAS-3) mission was part of an ongoing program to determine the Earth's energy balance and atmospheric change over an eleven-year solar cycle. Clervoy used the robotic arm to deploy the CRISTA-SPAS atmospheric research satellite 20 hours after lift-off, and logged 262 hours and 34 minutes in space and 175 earth orbits.
- STS-84 (May 15 – 24, 1997) was NASA's sixth Shuttle mission to rendezvous and dock with the Russian Space Station Mir. Assigned as payload commander, Clervoy's primary tasks were the management of more than 20 experiments, the operation of the docking system and the double module SPACEHAB, and the transfer of 4 tons of equipment between Atlantis and Mir. He was also trained as a contingency spacewalker on this mission. He logged 221 hours and 20 minutes in space and 144 earth orbits.
- STS-103 (December 19 – 27, 1999) primary objectives was the repair of the Hubble space telescope, which was put to sleep after successive failures of its gyroscopes, necessary to meet the telescope's very precise pointing requirements. Clervoy was the flight engineer for ascent, space rendezvous and entry. He used the robotic arm to capture and deploy the telescope, and to maneuver his crew mates during each of their three spacewalks each lasting more than eight hours. He logged 191 hours and 11 minutes in space and 120 Earth orbits.

== Current assignment ==
Clervoy is a member of ESA’s European Astronaut Corps, based at the European Astronaut Centre in Cologne, Germany. As part of his ESA collateral duties, Clervoy provides support to the human spaceflight programme, the external relations department and the sustainable development office. He is also Chairman and strategy manager of Novespace, a subsidiary of French space agency CNES in charge of the parabolic flight programme based on the A310 Zero-G aircraft in Bordeaux-Mérignac, France.

== Personal life ==
He is married to Laurence Boulanger and they have two children. Clervoy enjoys racquet sports, skill games, canyoning, skiing, and flying activities such as boomerang, frisbee, kites.

== Organisations ==
Member, Association of Space Explorers (ASE). Distinguished member, French Aeronautics and Astronautics Association (3AF). Member, Air and Space Academy (ANAE). Member, International Academy of Astronautics (IAA). Member, American Institute of Aeronautics and Astronautics (AIAA). Ambassador of the World Ocean Network. Patron of the marine life preservation non-profit association 'Te mana o te moana' in French Polynesia. JF Clervoy is also the ESA representative for the ocean exploration ‘SeaOrbiter’ project.

== Special honours ==
- Officer of the Legion of Honor
- Knight of the National Order of Merit
- NASA Space Flight Medals (three)
- NASA Exceptional Service Medals (two)
- Medal of Aeronautics
- Komarov and Koroliev Awards from the Fédération Aéronautique Internationale.

== Tributes ==
- A middle school is named after him in Franconville (Val-d'Oise) where he completed part of his schooling
- A media library is named after him at Longeville-lès-Metz (Moselle)
- The square of Sercy (Saone-et-Loire) is named after him

== Publications ==
Jean-François Clervoy is the author of the book "Histoire(s) d'Espace" relating his third mission towards the Hubble space telescope. He is also the co-author of the works: "Voler en apesanteur" and "Embarquer dès demain pour l'espace" (Ed. Vuibert), "Dans les bars des bouts du monde" and "La Diva, le Président et autres face-à-face" (Ed. L'Elocoquent), "Vox confidential" (Ed. Michel Lafon), "Histoire de la conquête spatiale" (Ed. Vuibert).

== Patent ==
Jean-François filed an international patent for the functions of the wrist watch ‘Speedmaster Skywalker X-33’ produced by Omega, tested and qualified by ESA.
