= Rémi Mathis =

French historian and librarian (born 1982)

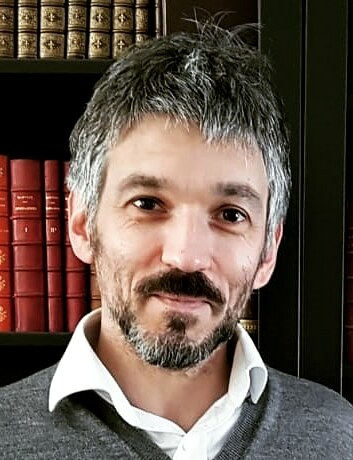
- Mathis in 2021
- Born: 20 November 1982 (age 43); Besançon, France
- Education: École Nationale des Chartes; École Nationale Supérieure des Sciences de l'Information et des Bibliothèques
- Occupations: Historian; library curator; Wikipedian
- Employer: Bibliothèque nationale de France
- Organizations: Wikimedia France; Nouvelles de l'estampe
- Spouse: Marie-Alice Mathis
- Father: Christian Mathis
- Awards: Wikipedian of the Year (2013)
- Mathis's voice Recorded March 2013

Rémi Mathis (French pronunciation: [ʁemi matis]; born 20 November 1982) is a French historian and curator. He was president of Wikimedia France from 2011 to 2014.

== Early life ==
Rémi Mathis was born on 20 November 1982 in Besançon, France, son of paleontologist Christian Mathis. Mathis graduated from the École Nationale des Chartes in 2007. The following year he obtained his degree from the National School of Information Science and Libraries.

In 2010, he married Marie-Alice Mathis, a neuroscientist.

== Career ==
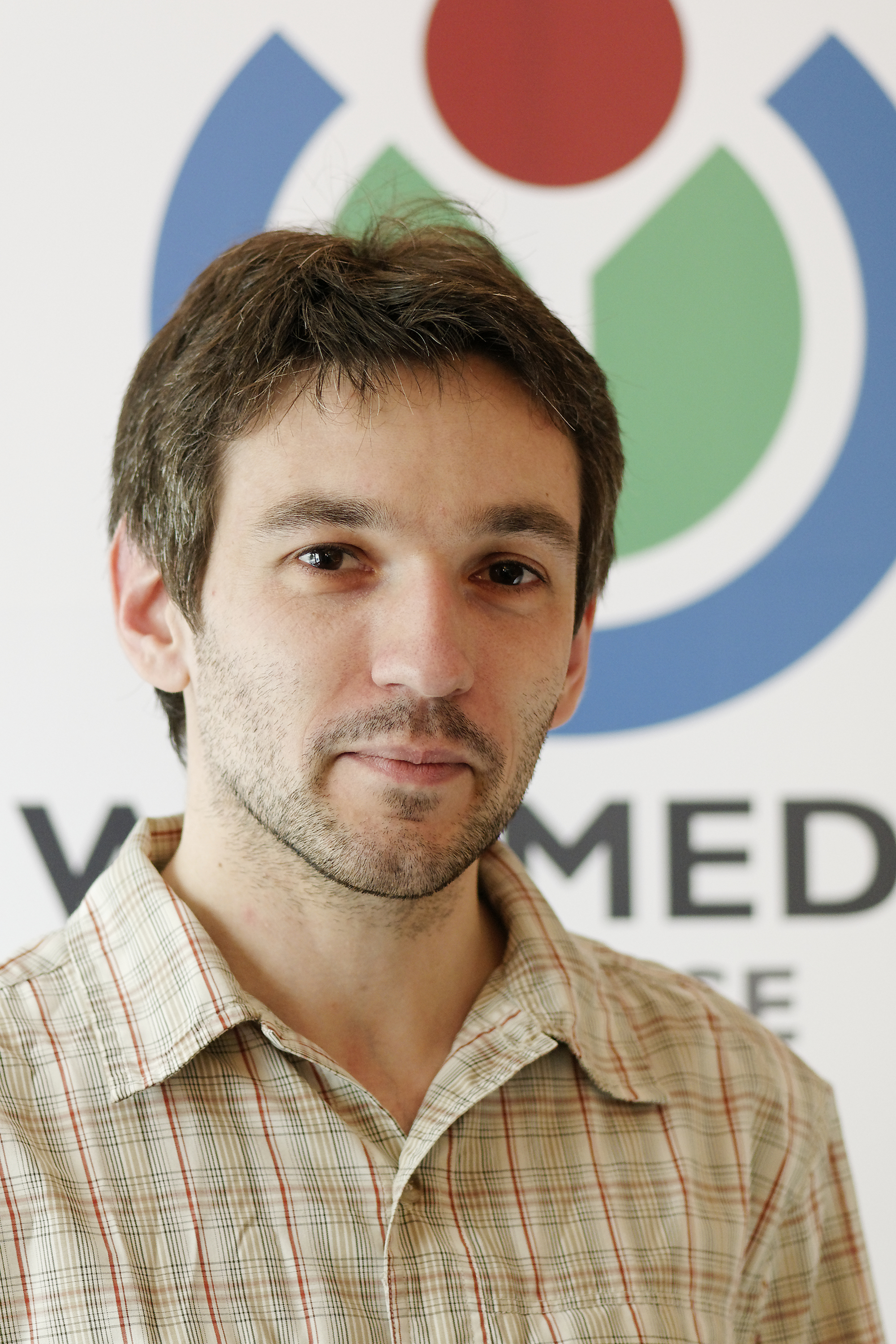
Mathis in 2010

Mathis was in charge of the library of humanities and social science at the Paris Descartes University from 2008 to 2010. Since 2010, he has been a curator for 17th-century collections at the Department of Prints and Photographs of the National Library of France. He is the editor of the French academic journal on printmaking Nouvelles de l'estampe. He is a member of the National Committee for French Engraving (French: Comité national de l'estampe).

Mathis's research focuses on the 17th century, specifically the history of prints and books, Jansenism, and diplomatic history. His dissertation, written under the supervision of Lucien Bély and Olivier Poncet, focuses on Simon Arnauld de Pomponne. In 2012, he wrote a book about Pomponne and Robert Arnauld d'Andilly. He has contributed to Papers on French Seventeenth Century Literature. and curated an exhibition on French prints of the 17th c. (Getty-BnF, 2015–2016).

He was made a knight in the order of Arts and Letters and in the Order of Academic Palmes.

== Free culture advocacy ==
Mathis is active in promoting the legalization of freedom of panorama in France. He also advocates against the privatization of the digitization of public-domain works. His work in the culture sector and free culture movement has earned him the nickname "Janus de la transmission," by Le Magazine littéraire.

He was a member and chairperson of Wikimedia France, and served as president from April 2011 to October 2014. In April 2013, the French interior intelligence agency Direction centrale du renseignement intérieur (DCRI) pressured Mathis into deleting the French language Wikipedia article about the Pierre-sur-Haute military radio station, under threat of detention and criminal charges. The article was later restored by another Wikipedia contributor based in Switzerland.

In 2013, he was named Wikipedian of the Year by Jimmy Wales at Wikimania.

== See also ==
- List of Wikipedia people

== Bibliography ==
- De la négociation à la relation d'ambassade : Simon Arnauld de Pomponne et sa deuxième ambassade de Suède (1671), Revue d'histoire diplomatique, 2005, 3, p. 263–276
- Simon Arnauld de Pomponne, secrétaire d'État des Affaires étrangères de Louis XIV (1618–1699), thesis. O. Poncet and L. Bely, 2007, 2 vols. (Vol. 1, text, 691 p., Vol. 2, vouchers, 621 p.)
- Un Arnauld à l'hôtel de Rambouillet : note sur un poème inconnu d'Henri Arnauld, évêque janséniste d'Angers. 17th century 2008, 4, p. 725–730.
- Les « mondes à part » : représentations symboliques et critiques de la mise à l'écart au XVIIe siècle. Papers on French Seventeenth Century Literature, Vol. XXXVIII, No. 73, 2010 (with G. Louis and F. Poulet).
- Les bibliographies nationales rétrospectives. Entre recherche d’identité et identité de la recherche. Saarbrücken: European University Publishing, 2010, 120 p. ISBN 9786131510113.
- Politique, jansénisme et sociabilité dans le Comminges du Grand Siècle : l'amitié entre Gilbert de Choiseul, évêque de Comminges, et Simon Arnauld de Pomponne, 1659–1662. 2011.
- Le Solitaire et le Ministre : autour de la correspondance Arnauld d'Andilly-Arnauld de Pomponne (1642–1673), Paris, Nolin, 2012 (coll. Univers Port-Royal, 21), 272 p. ISBN 9782910487409.
- Ruine et survie de Port-Royal (1679–1713). Proceedings of the conference convened by Hermann Sylvio De Franceschi and Rémi Mathis. Paris, Society of Friends of Port-Royal, 2012.
