= Henri Martre =

French telecommunications engineer (1928–2018)

- Born: 6 February 1928; Bélesta, France
- Died: 3 July 2018 (aged 90)
- Education: École Polytechnique
- Engineering career
- Discipline: Telecommunications
- Institutions: Délégation générale pour l'armement
- Practice name: Aérospatiale
- Employer: French Aerospace Industries Association
- Awards: Grand Croix of the Légion d'honneur

Henri Martre (6 February 1928 – 3 July 2018) was a French telecommunications engineer. He headed both the Délégation générale pour l'armement, the aerospace conglomerate Aérospatiale and the French Aerospace Industries Association (GIFAS). He was considered one of the main promoters in France of "competitive intelligence".

Henri Martre received the Grand Croix of the Légion d'honneur on 31 December 2002.

== Biography ==
Martre was born on 6 February 1928 in Bélesta, Ariège. He was admitted at the École Polytechnique in 1947 and chose the Corps of Military Telecom (which later merged into the Corps de l'armement) upon graduation in 1950. In 1952 he graduated from Sup Télécom.

Martre embodied the French "high tech" colbertism; he was involved with most major aerospace and defence programmes between 1955 and 1995 (Concorde, Airbus, Ariane, etc.). He reached the top of French administration being Délégué général pour l'armement between 1977 and 1983 and was then CEO of Aérospatiale between 1983 and 1991. This typical switch from public administration to industry is called pantouflage in France. After his departure from Aérospatiale, Martre was chairman of the AFNOR (French Association for Normalization) between 1993 and 2002.

Subsequently, Martre began a third career as an intellectual. He was considered one of the precursors in France of competitive intelligence. In the framework of the Commissariat général du Plan, he wrote in 1994 a report entitled "Competitive intelligence and business strategy, in collaboration with Philippe Baumard and Christian Harbulot.

He died on 3 July 2018 at the age of 90.

== Books ==
- "L'intelligence économique : Quelles perspectives ?", avec Hélène Masson, Paris, L’Harmattan, 2004
- "Pratique de l'analyse fonctionnelle", avec Robert Tassinari, Paris, Editions Dunod, 2003
- "Intelligence économique et stratégie des entreprises", Travaux du groupe présidé par Henri Martre, La Documentation française, 1994

== See also ==
- Coopetition
