= Alain Bugat =

French nuclear engineer (1948–2019)

- Born: 1948; France
- Died: 20 January 2019 (aged 70–71)
- Education: École Polytechnique; ENSTA ParisTech
- Engineering career
- Discipline: Nuclear engineering

Alain Bugat (1948 - 20 January 2019) was a French nuclear engineer, research administrator and chief executive. He headed the Commissariat à l'énergie atomique from 2003 to 2009 and was chief executive of several engineering companies. He is an ingénieur général de l'armement.

Bugat played an active role in bringing public research to practical application.

He was a member of the board of directors of the RATP Group and of the Académie des technologies.

== Biography ==
Bugat was admitted to the Polytechnique in 1968 and chose the Corps de l'armement upon graduation in 1971. He graduated from ENSTA in 1973 and entered the Directorate of Military Applications of the Commissariat à l'énergie atomique . Between 1982 he worked at the Ministry of Industry and came back to the Directorate of Military Applications of the CEA in 1984.

In 1989, he became Deputy General Director of CISI Ingenierie and Director General in March 1992.

In December 1992, Bugat became the second Head of the Direction des Technologies Avancées (Directorate of Advanced Technologies) of the CEA. This directorate was created in 1989 at the request of the French government to spread the scientific and technological capital acquired through public nuclear funding to a wider public, in particular high tech SMEs. This was the mission de diffusion technologique (technology diffusion mission). The first Director of Advanced Technologies was Yannick d'Escatha.

In 1999 Bugat was appointed CEO of Technicatome.

In 2003, he was appointed head of the Commissariat à l'énergie atomique (CEA), and in 2006, his appointment was renewed. Bugat organized a reorientation of the CEA towards environmental technologies.

In 2009 he became CEO of the consulting firm Nucadvisor.

Alain Bugat died 20 January 2019 at the age of 70 years old.

== See also ==
- Technology diffusion
