= Jean-Paul Herteman =

French aerospace engineer (born 1950)

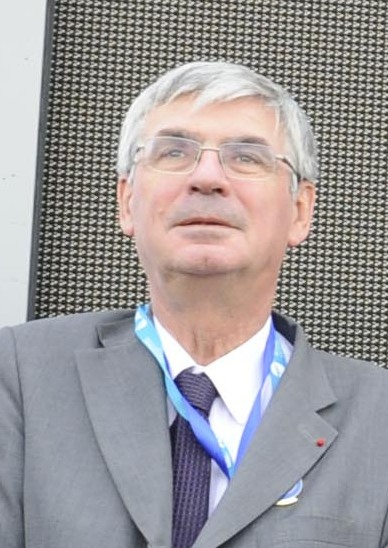
- Born: 13 November 1950 (age 75); Saint-Cloud, France
- Education: École Polytechnique, Supaéro
- Occupations: CEO Safran until 2015; Chairman GIFAS

Jean-Paul Herteman (born 1950) is a French aerospace engineer, materials scientist and chief executive. He was CEO of Safran until April 2015, the French aerospace engine & equipment manufacturer, and chairman of both the French Aerospace Industries Association (GIFAS) and of the AeroSpace and Defence Industries Association of Europe(ASD). He is vice-chairman of the Conseil général de l'armement (General Council of Armament) chaired by the Minister of Defence.

== Biography ==
Born in 1950, Jean-Paul Herteman was admitted at the École Polytechnique in 1970 (X70). He graduated in 1973 and chose the Corps de l'armement. He graduated from Supaéro in 1975 and began his career at the Centre d'essais aéronautiques de Toulouse (Direction générale de l'armement) in the field of aerospace materials testing. He entered the Snecma in 1984, and was CEO of Safran from 2007 to April 2015.

== Career ==
Most of Herteman's career is within Snecma Group (now Safran) in engineering and technical positions.

1984 : Head of materials and processes research programmes
1987 : Deputy director of Quality
1989 : Vice President for Quality (+ Chairman of Quality board at GIFAS)
1993 : Head of Snecma Design Department
1994 : Deputy Director of Engineering
1995 : Director of CFM56 programmes
1996 : Vice President of CFM International
1996 : Vice President for Engineering at Snecma
1999 : Head of the Rocket Engine Division (Société européenne de propulsion)
2002 : CEO of Snecma Moteurs
2004 : Executive Vice President of the Snecma Group (Aerospace propulsion Branch)
2007 : Chairman of the board of directors of Safran
2007 : Chairman of the French Aerospace Industries Association GIFAS
2010 : Vice Chairman of the Conseil général de l'armement
April 2011 : CEO and Chairman of the Board of Safran
5 July 2012 : reelected Chairman of the GIFAS

On 9 June 2011, a few days before the Paris Air Show, Jean-Paul Herteman was interviewed (in French) by the French radio broadcast Europe 1. In the 9 minute interview, Jean-Paul Herteman described his views about feminisation at Safran, its international expansion (US, Italy, China) and its new LEAP engine design.

In this interview, Herteman gives a description of the new board of directors resulting from the structure change of the company. This structure is now smaller (15 instead of 27 before), with 5 women, Francis Mer as vice President, the French American chairman of Caltech Jean-Lou Chameau, and Giovanni Bisignani, former Head of IATA and of Alitalia.

== See also ==
- Aerospace materials
- CFM International LEAP
- A320neo
- Comac
- COMAC C919
- Clean Sky
