= François Forget =

French astrophysicist (born 1967)

Francois Forget (born in 1967) is a French astrophysicist, specializing in the exploration of the Solar System and planetary environments. He is a research director at the CNRS and a member of the French Academy of Sciences.

== Biography ==
After graduating from ENSTA Paris in 1991 and subsequently defending his thesis on the study of the planet Mars in 1996, François Forget became a CNRS research fellow in 1998. He created the "planetology" team of the Laboratory of Dynamic Meteorology (LMD) in 2003 and then headed the "Solar System" pole of the Pierre-Simon-Laplace Institute from 2009 to 2017. He worked at NASA between 2004 and 2005 and became CNRS Research Director at the LMD in 2010.

Personal life: he has three children born in 1997, 2000 and 2025

== Works ==
François Forget is involved in many space missions such as Mars Express (ESA), ExoMars Trace Gas Orbiter (ESA), New Horizons (NASA), InSight (NASA) or Rover ExoMars (ESA).

He studies the climate and atmospheres on the telluric planets of the solar system (Mars, Venus, Pluto, Titan, Triton) and on exoplanets. To do this, it has developed digital models designed to simulate environments on these planets in order to analyze space observations, prepare robotic missions, study the habitability of exoplanets and better understand the Earth.

== Distinctions ==
- Elected member of the French Academy of Sciences in December 2017
- In 2014, François Forget received the David Bates Medal from the EGU for his work on modelling the climate of the planets of the solar and extrasolar system and "for having set up one of the first qualitative frameworks allowing comparative planetology"
- CNRS Bronze medal in 2001

== Bibliography ==
- La Planète Mars : histoire d'un autre monde, Belin, 2006, 160 p. (ISBN 2-7011-4200-8)
- Solar System and Planets, Ellipse, 2009, 249 p. (ISBN 2-7011-4200-8)
