= Philippe Baumard =

French academic

- Born: 1968 (age 57–58); Paris, France
- Known for: Tacit Knowledge; Strategic Learning
- Scientific career
- Fields: Strategic Management; Organizational Behavior; Organization Theory
- Workplaces: École Polytechnique; University of Aix-Marseille II; University of California, Berkeley; Stanford University; University of Aix-Marseille

Philippe N. Baumard (born 1968) graduated from the University of Aix-Marseille II (BA industrial economics, 1990), and Paris Dauphine University (MSc, 1991; Ph.D. 1994). Baumard is an organizational scientist who has held visiting professorships at New York University from 1997 to 1998, University of California, Berkeley from 2004 to 2007, Stanford University from 2008 to 2010. He is a professor at the French National Conservatory of Arts and Crafts (CNAM), associate-researcher at École Polytechnique's Chair on Innovation & Regulation, Paris, and president of the scientific council of France's High Council for Strategic Education and Research.

== Education and career ==
Baumard received his early education at the Military Academies of Saint-Cyr-l'École (1983) and Aix-en-Provence (1985). He studied industrial and international economics at the University of Aix-Marseille II, and published his first book, Strategy and Surveillance of Competitive Environments while a graduate student. This early work foresaw the rise of a global knowledge-driven economy where surveillance provides a source of capitalist gains. Baumard coined it the "neo-panoptic economy", inspired by Jeremy Bentham's panopticon, and Michel Foucault's Discipline and Punish. Warning readers of the potential threats to individual freedom in a network economy, Baumard described how "seeing without being seen" would become an inescapable engine of growth. He joined the History Dept of the French School of Advanced Studies in Social Sciences in 1990, where he explored the role of informational loss in the failure of French Guinea's independence in the early 1960s.

== Research ==
Baumard's areas of interest include organization theory, competitive dynamics, implicit learning and managerial cognition, innovation and managerial failures. He was an early contributor to the study of tacit knowledge in organizations, stressing the role of tacit and intuitive processes in dealing with crises and ambiguous situations. His findings led to the development of an artificial intelligence engine that aims at replicating implicit and tacit learning in human communications. In 1997, he collaborated with Prof. Bo Hedberg, Stockholm University, on "imaginary organizations"; this research examined how boundary-less organizations learn from their rapid growth and pitfalls. In 2000, he joined France Telecom - Orange as an in-house strategist, and started research on R&D transformation and strategic turnover. In 2005, he published with William H. Starbuck an article in Long Range Planning that concluded that firms do not learn from their failures. Baumard and Starbuck found that managers interpreted small failures as demonstrating the foolishness of attempts to deviate from the firm's core principles, but these interpretation processes tended to modernize the core beliefs. Where such interpretations were very implausible, managers dismissed the small failures as idiosyncratic. Thus, ventures did not really test the validity of the core beliefs. Managers attributed all of the large failures to idiosyncratic causes that had been beyond the company's control. His recent research focuses on learning in "coopetitive" environments, where managers and R&D engineers need to learn with partners that are simultaneously competitors.

Baumard has published over 80 articles on organizational learning, intelligence, business strategy, machine learning, information warfare, forecasting, perception, organizational façades.

== Government ==
From 1992 to 1994, Baumard held the position of secretary of the Commission on Competitive Intelligence and Corporate Strategies (Commissariat général du Plan) during the presidency of Henri Martre. The co-authored report was published in February 1994, and was influential in shaping France's public policy on competitive intelligence. In 1996, he contributed to the first edition of Campen, Dearth and Gooden's book: Cyberwar: Security, Strategy and Conflict in the Information Age, published by the Armed Forces Communications and Electronics Association. This chapter warned about the inefficiency of information warfare policies based on the control of information infrastructure, and advocated for a shift towards "knowledge warfare", where fast sensemaking is a critical capability. In 1997, he joined the School of Economic Warfare in Paris (EGE), a branch of the privately owned ESLSCA. He was appointed president of the Scientific Council of France's National Council for Strategic Education & Research in March 2010.

== Selected publications ==
- Baumard P. (2010) "Learning in coopetitive environments", pp. 74–100 in: S. Yami, S. Castaldo, G. Battisto-Dagnino, F. Le Roy(Eds), Coopetition: Winning strategies for the 21st century: Northampton, MA: Edward Edgar Publishing.
- Abrahamson E. and P. Baumard (2008) “What Lies Behind Facades and How do Organizational Façades lie? A study of Mess, Inertia, and Fraudulence.”, pp. 437–452 in: G. Gerard P. Hodgkinson and W.H. Starbuck(Eds.), The Oxford Handbook of Organizational Decision Making, Oxford University Press.
- Baumard, P (2008), “Using Machine Foreknowledge to enhance human cognition”, pp. 365–375 in: P. Naim, O. Pourret et B. Marcot (Eds), Bayesian Networks: A Practical Guide to Applications, Chichester, UK: John Wiley & Sons
- Starbuck, W.H.; Barnett, M.L.; Baumard, P. (2008). "Payoffs And Pitfalls Of Strategic Learning". Journal of Economic Behavior and Organization. 66: 7–21. doi:10.1016/j.jebo.2007.02.003.
- Turc, E. and P. Baumard (2007), "Can Organizations Really Unlearn?", pp. 125–146 in: C.R. McInerney and R.E. Day (EDS), Rethinking Knowledge Management: From Knowledge Objects to Knowledge Processes, Bloomington, IN: Springer.
- Baumard P. and W.H. Starbuck (2006) « Is Organisational Learning a Myth », Advanced Institute of Management Research, London: Economic & Social Research Council.
- Baumard, P.; Starbuck, W.H. (2005). "Learning From Failures: Why It May Not Happen". Long Range Planning. 38 (3): 281–298. doi:10.1016/j.lrp.2005.03.004. S2CID 154803489.
- Baumard, P (2002). "Tacit knowledge in professional firms: the teachings of firms in very puzzling situations". Journal of Knowledge Management. 6 (2): 135–151. doi:10.1108/13673270210424666.
- Hedberg, B, Baumard P. and A. Yakhlef (2002), Managing Imaginary Organizations, Oxford, UK: Pergamon Press.
- Baumard, P (1994). "From Noticing to Making Sense: Using Intelligence to Develop Strategy". International Journal of Intelligence and CounterIntelligence. 7 (1): 29–73. doi:10.1080/08850609408435236.
