= GEIPAN =

French space research unit (founded in 1977)

- Study and Information Group on Unidentified Aerospace Phenomena
- Groupe d'Études et d'Informations sur les Phénomènes Aérospatiaux Non-identifiés
- Abbreviation: GEIPAN
- Formation: 1977; 49 years ago
- Founder: Claude Poher
- Type: Nonprofit
- Location: Toulouse, France
- Leader: Frederic Courtade
- Key people: Yves Sillard
- Parent organization: French Space Agency
- Website: www.geipan.fr
- Formerly called: GEPAN, SEPRA

GEIPAN (an acronym in French for Groupe d'Études et d'Informations sur les Phénomènes Aérospatiaux Non-identifiés, or Unidentified Aerospace Phenomena Research and Information Group) (/ɡaɪˈpɑːn/) is a unit of the French space agency CNES based in Toulouse, whose mission is to investigate unidentified aerospace phenomena (UAP) and make its findings available to the public.

== History and developments ==
GEIPAN was founded in 1977 as GEPAN (Groupe d'Étude des Phénomènes Aérospatiaux Non-identifiés, Study Group for Unidentified Aerospace Phenomena). Claude Poher was the inaugural director, under the permission of then director general of CNES Yves Sillard.

GEPAN was renamed to SEPRA (Service d'Expertise des Phénomènes de Rentrée Atmosphérique, Atmospheric Re-entry Phenomena Expertise Department) in 1988, and then to Service d'Expertise des Phénomènes Rares Aérospatiaux ("rare aerospace phenomena expertise department") in 2000. In 2005, the research unit was renamed to GEIPAN.

The French Gendarmerie was instructed to channel data from reports of UFO sightings to SEPRA, which therefore was in a position to draw on a large database of such events. In cases where physical traces appeared to be present, SEPRA could call on the technical resources of CNES to perform a thorough scientific investigation. A famous example of such an investigation was the Trans-en-Provence Case.

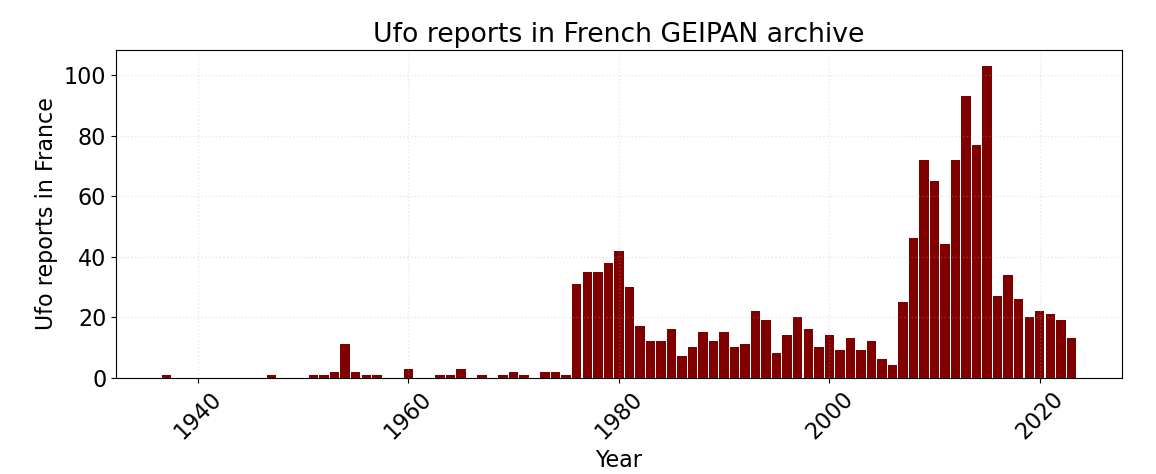
Sightings numbers per year

In March 2007, GEIPAN started to make its archives available online to the public. The same year, French skeptics criticized the quality of their investigative work, arguing the sightings were too quickly filed as unidentified. On March 26, 2007, the CNES' own report said that 28% of sightings remain unidentified.

More recent reports of GEIPAN estimate the unidentified sightings at around 3%.

== Directors ==
=== GEPAN period ===
- 1977–1978 Claude Poher
- 1979–1983 Alain Esterle
- 1984–1988 Jean-Jacques Velasco

=== SEPRA period ===
- 1988–2004 Jean-Jacques Velasco

=== GEIPAN period ===
- 2005–2009 Jacques Patenet
- 2009–2011 Yves Blanc
- 2011–2015 Xavier Passot
- 2016–2019 Jean-Paul Aguttes
- 2019–2020 Roger Baldacchino
- 2021–2023 Vincent Costes
- 2024–present Frederic Courtade

== See also ==
- List of UFO organizations
