= François Philippe Voisin =

French engineer (1821–1918)

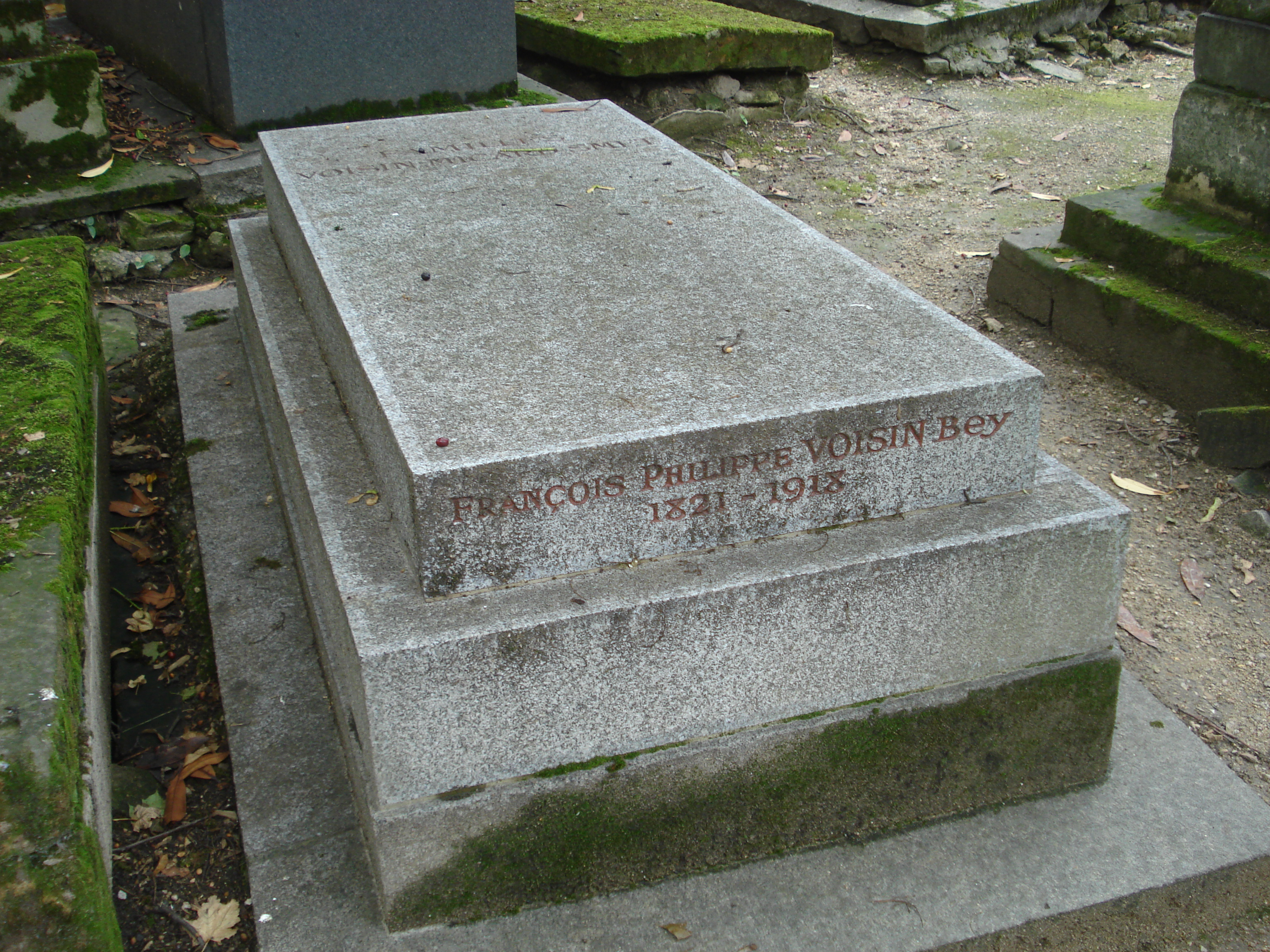
- Born: 20 May 1821; Versailles
- Died: 17 March 1918 (aged 96); Paris
- Citizenship: France
- Education: École Polytechnique
- Occupation: Engineer
- Known for: Chief Engineer (1861-1870) Suez Canal
- Awards: Title of Bey

François Philippe Voisin, (Voisin-Bey) (May 20, 1821 – March 17, 1918) was a French engineer. He was a graduate of the École Polytechnique, an engineer for the Corps of Bridges, Waters and Forests, and was, from 1861 to 1870, the Chief Engineer for the Suez Canal Company in its construction of the Suez Canal (number 2 in the company after director Ferdinand de Lesseps).

== Biography ==
=== Education ===
François Philippe Voisin was educated at the École Polytechnique.

=== Engineering career ===
After graduation, Voisin worked as an engineer with the French Corps of Bridges, Waters and Forests. In 1861 he left to work as Chief engineer for the Suez Canal Company. There, he was second in command for construction of the canal after Ferdinand de Lesseps. Voisin hired contractors Paul Borel and Alexandre Lavalley in December 1863 to engineer the dredging machines that would excavate the canal from 1864 to 1869 after the administrative ruler of Egypt, Ismail, outlawed the use of corvee labor.

=== Later career ===
Voisin returned to France in 1870, when he became a professor at École des Ponts et Chaussées. In 1880, affected by Algeria, he participated in an engineering study for a transcontinental railroad spanning from Algeria to Niger, which many decades later developed into the Mediterranean–Niger Railway (after an exploration and report by Adolphe Duponchel in 1879, French authorities wanted to create a new commercial railroad route connecting Algeria and Niger). In 1884, Voisin became a member of the Board of Directors for the Suez Canal Company.

The authority he acquired in marine engineering issues was such that the government appointed Voisin as chairman of the French delegation to the different Navigation Congresses that met across Europe from 1886 to 1890.

In 1893, he became Vice Chairman of the Suez Canal Company. He devoted his efforts to this position for 20 years. He was Inspector General of Bridges and Roads.

=== Death ===
Voisin died on March 17, 1918, in Paris. He is interred at the Montmartre Cemetery with his daughter Marie-Louise Voisin, (1855-1932), his son-in-law Jean-François-Nicolas Micard, (1852-1931), Chairman of the Industrial and Agricultural Society of Pointe a Pitre since its foundation in 1907, Chairman of the Audit Committee of the Suez Canal Company in 1895, his grandson, Gaston Micard, student of the Ecole Polytechnique, and his granddaughter Mathilde Micard and her spouse Tony-Louis-Octave Smet, named honorary master of requests to the Council of State in 1903.

== Family ==
Voisin was the son of Jacques-Philippe Voisin and Marie-Louise Douillet. Voisin married Mathilde Aronssohn on March 30, 1854, in Strasbourg. Mathilde was the daughter of Jacques-Léon Aronssohn, an associate professor at the University of Strasbourg and the doctor for King Louis-Philippe and Caroline Levy. Mathilde died in the cholera epidemic that struck the Suez Canal construction zone in 1865.

== Titles ==
In 1866, the administration of Egypt under the authority of the Ottoman Empire granted Voisin the title of Bey (Voisin-Bey).

== See also ==
- Paul Flatters

== Bibliography ==
- "Biographie de Philippe Voisin-Bey" (PDF). www.cealex.org (24). Le Canal: 14, 15. June 1956. Archived from the original (PDF) on 2016-03-03.
- "BnF Gallica Search (Fr)"., Voisin-Bey
- Karabell, Zachary (2003). Parting the desert: the creation of the Suez Canal. Alfred A. Knopf. ISBN 0-375-40883-5.
- "Mort de M. Voisin-Bey". gallica.bnf.fr. Le Temps. March 20, 1918.
- "Obsèques de M. Voisin-Bey". gallica.bnf.fr. Le Figaro. March 23, 1918.
