= Cadre d'emplois =

In France, within the territorial civil service (fonction publique territoriale) employment frameworks (cadres d'emplois) constitute specific statutes corresponding to various jobs to be filled. They are roughly equivalent to the corps found in the French state civil service.

== Definition ==
Article 4 of Law No. 84-53 of 26 January 1984 originally provided that territorial civil servants would be grouped into corps, similar to civil servants of the State and public hospital establishments. However, Law No. 87-529 of 13 July 1987 substituted the concept of the employment framework (cadre d'emplois). Only the agents of the commune-department of Paris were grouped into corps.

The aforementioned law of 26 January 1984 states:

An employment framework groups together civil servants subject to the same specific statute, holding a grade that qualifies them to occupy a set of jobs. Each holder of a grade is qualified to occupy certain jobs corresponding to that grade. The employment framework may group together several grades.

Sociologically, the employment framework is defined less by a specific trade or technical skill and more by the capacity of individuals to hold a specific rank in the administrative hierarchy. Access to a framework often requires passing a competitive examination (concours) which serves to unify the specific employment branch while differentiating it from others (e.g., distinguishing "administrators" from "technicians").

== Roles and hierarchy ==
The employment frameworks are structured hierarchically, separating execution tasks from management and conception.

- Category A: This category includes managers and policy makers.
  - Territorial administrators (administrateurs territoriaux): A small, elite framework (approximately 1,800 staff in 2006) primarily present in large cities, General Councils, and Regional Councils.
  - Territorial attachés (attachés territoriaux): Considered the "modal level" of local management, this framework is much larger (approximately 43,500 staff in 2006). Attachés are present in almost all local government agencies; in smaller municipalities, they often serve as the managing director (directeur général des services), while in larger towns they act as department heads. Their role involves the conception and implementation of public policies in administrative, financial, and social sectors.
- Category B: An intermediate level.
  - Territorial editors (rédacteurs territoriaux): Situated below attachés, they perform administrative and financial management tasks and draft legal instruments.
- Category C: The execution level.
  - Administrative assistants (adjoints administratifs): Tasked with the application of regulations and execution of administrative work, relying on "basic knowledge" rather than the conceptual analysis required of Category A frameworks.

Distinct from the administrative stream, the Technical stream (e.g., Engineers) operates with different professional norms; for instance, competitive exams for engineers value concise, technical expression, whereas administrative exams (like those for attachés) favor "philosophical, journalistic, or legalistic" forms of expression.

== Access to different employment frameworks ==
Access to the different employment frameworks is conditioned upon passing a competitive examination (concours) or obtaining an internal promotion.

The competitive examination can be:

- External, for candidates not already in the civil service (students, job seekers);
- Internal, for civil servants who have completed four years of effective service;
- A third competition, for individuals who have worked at least eight years in the private sector.

Different examinations are organized for each level of the employment framework. For the framework of territorial administrator, the examination is that of the Institut national des études territoriales (INET). For the framework of territorial attachés, examinations are organized at the departmental level by each Management center of the territorial civil service. The City of Paris, which has a specific statute, does not depend on any center as it acts as its own management center. It therefore organizes its own attaché examination for the City of Paris.

Other employment frameworks are filled by specific examinations organized for each stream and each employment framework based on needs. Each year, examinations for territorial engineer, animator, or territorial professors are organized by the management centers or by the National Centre for Territorial Public Service.

== Typology ==
Employment frameworks are, in turn, grouped into ten job streams (filières). Within the same stream, there are several employment frameworks. Each employment framework is attached to one of three categories: A, B, or C (see French civil service#Grades). For example, the administrative stream includes the employment frameworks of territorial administrator, territorial attaché, and secretary of the town hall (secrétaire de mairie) in Category A; territorial editor in Category B; and administrative assistant in Category C (following a law of 22 December 2006, the category of administrative agent was abolished and integrated into the employment framework of administrative assistants). The statute of each employment framework is national and established by a decree in the Council of State.

- Administrative:
  - Territorial administrators (Cat. A+)
  - Territorial attachés (Cat. A)
  - Secretaries of the town hall (Cat. A)
  - Territorial editors (Cat. B)
  - Territorial administrative assistants (Cat. C)
- Technical:
  - Chief territorial engineers (Cat. A+)
  - Territorial engineers (Cat. A)
  - Territorial technicians (Cat. B)
  - Territorial supervisors (Cat. C)
  - Territorial supervisors of educational establishments (Cat. C)
  - Territorial technical assistants (Cat. C)
  - Territorial technical assistants of educational establishments (Cat. C)
- Cultural:
  - Territorial curators of heritage (Cat. A+)
  - Territorial curators of libraries (Cat. A+)
  - Directors of territorial establishments for artistic education (Cat. A)
  - Territorial professors of artistic education (Cat. A)
  - Territorial attachés for heritage conservation (Cat. A)
  - Territorial librarians (Cat. A)
  - Territorial assistants for heritage and library conservation (Cat. B)
  - Territorial assistants for artistic education (music, dance, drama, visual arts) (Cat. B)
  - Territorial heritage assistants (Cat. C)
- Sports:
  - Territorial advisors of physical and sporting activities (Cat. A)
  - Territorial educators of physical and sporting activities (Cat. B)
  - Territorial operators of physical and sporting activities (Cat. C)
- Animation:
  - Territorial animator (Cat. B)
  - Territorial animation assistant (Cat. C)
- Social:
  - Territorial socio-educational advisors (Cat. A)
  - Territorial socio-educational assistants (Cat. B)
  - Territorial early childhood educators (Cat. B)
  - Territorial monitors-educators (Cat. B)
  - Specialized territorial agents for nursery schools (Cat. C)
  - Territorial social agents (Cat. C)
- Medico-Social:
  - Territorial doctor (Cat. A)
  - Territorial psychologist (Cat. A)
  - Territorial midwife (Cat. A)
  - Childcare health executives (Cat. A)
  - Nursing and rehabilitation health executives (Cat. A)
  - Territorial childcare workers (Cat. A)
  - Territorial nurses (Cat. B)
  - Territorial childcare auxiliaries (Cat. C)
  - Territorial care auxiliaries (Cat. C)
- Medico-Technical:
  - Territorial biologist, veterinarian, and pharmacist (Cat. A)
  - Territorial paramedical technicians (Cat. B)
- Municipal Police:
  - Director of municipal police (Cat. A)
  - Chief of municipal police service (Cat. B)
  - Municipal police agents (Cat. C)
  - Rural guards (gardes champêtres) (Cat. C)
- Fire and Rescue:
  - Captains, commandants, lieutenant-colonels, and colonels of professional firefighters (Cat. A+)
  - Doctors and pharmacists of professional firefighters (Cat. A)
  - Lieutenants of professional firefighters (Cat. B)
  - Management nurses of professional firefighters (Cat. A)
  - Nurses of professional firefighters (Cat. B)
  - Non-commissioned professional firefighters (Cat. C)

== See also ==
- Territorial collectivity
- Institut national des études territoriales (INET)

== Sources ==
- Biland, Émilie (7–9 September 2009). Formes de compétence et savoirs de gouvernement : Session 1, Réformes, formation à l’administration et figures de l’administrateur. 10e Congrès de l'Association Française de Science Politique (AFSP). Grenoble: Association Française de Science Politique.
