= Grands corps de l'État =

The grands corps de l'État (French pronunciation: [ɡʁɑ̃ kɔʁ d(ə) leta]; English: Grand Corps of the French State) are a feature of the French state as envisaged in the reforms of Jean-Baptiste Colbert. Some of these grands corps date back to the reign of Louis XV, in the 18th century, but most originated or were given their modern form during the reign of Napoleon.

The exact list of grands corps de l'État is debatable, mainly because there is disagreement about whether a particular corps is grand enough to be counted. However, Who's Who in France gives the following list: the ingénieurs des mines, the ingénieurs des ponts, the administrateurs de l'INSEE, the ingénieurs de l'armement, the conseillers d'État, the Cour des comptes and the inspecteurs des finances.

In France, the members of these grand corps have great importance in the government administration, since many executive positions are held by them. Many senior corporate executives of French companies come straight out of these Grand Corps.

== Administrative grands corps ==
The administrative grands corps mainly recruit graduates of the École nationale d'administration (ENA). They are more closely connected with politics than the technical grands corps are. Georges Pompidou was member of the Conseil d'État, François Hollande and Jacques Chirac were both members of the Cour des comptes, and Emmanuel Macron, Valéry Giscard d'Estaing and Michel Rocard were members of the Inspection des finances.

- Conseil d'État
- Inspection des finances
- Cour des comptes

== Technical grands corps ==
The technical grands corps mainly recruit from graduates of the École Polytechnique, Écoles normales supérieures or other schools such as École des Ponts and École des Mines.

- Corps des mines
- Corps of Bridges, Waters and Forests
- Corps de l'armement
- Corps de l'INSEE

Three other technical grands corps no longer function:

- The Corps des télécommunications was merged in 2009 into the Corps des mines.
- The Corps du génie rural, des eaux et des forêts was merged in 2009 into the Corps of Bridges, Waters and Forests.
- The Corps des poids et mesures was merged into the Corps des mines in 2007.

== Criticism of grands corps ==
The system of grands corps has been criticised from within its own ranks as well as from outside. In January 2009, a report on the future of the technical grands corps was sent to the Prime Minister.

== See also ==
- French Civil Service
- Senior Executive Service

== External links (English) ==
- New York Times, 15/12/2010, Patrick Mehr (X-Mines), France's Golden Handcuffs, The reason for pessimism about France’s future is its stifling and antiquated governmental control of every aspect of entrepreneurial life
- Virginia Tech Center
- Worldbank, French Civil service has so far shunned change
- United Nations, April 2006, France Public Administration Profile
- Council of European studies, March 2006, Inside the Autonomous State Elites, Ideas, and Power in The Reform of French Health Policy
- 2010, William Genieys, The New Custodians of the State: Programmatic Elites in French Society

== External links (French) ==
- Le Groupe des Associations de la Haute Fonction Publique (ou "G 16") a été créé en 1995. Il regroupe les associations et syndicats représentant les corps civils de hauts fonctionnaires "administrants", soit environ 8 000 hauts fonctionnaires recrutés pour une large part d'entre eux à la sortie de l'Ecole Polytechnique et de l'Ecole Nationale d'Administration
- Fédération des Grands Corps Techniques de l'État (FGCTE)
- … par des corps scolairement dominés…
- Archives de France, 2004, Napoléon et la construction des grands corps de l'État, Napoléon Bonaparte est bien à l’origine du Conseil d’État, de la Cour de cassation et de la Cour des comptes, mais il est aussi, si l’on entend donner une acception large à ce terme, le père du corps préfectoral, de l’inspection des finances, de même qu’il réorganise les corps des mines et des ponts et chaussées
- revue administrative, mai 1986, MC Kessler, Les grands corps
- Conseil d'État, 2003, perspectives pour la fonction publique
- Cour des Comptes, avril 2001, La Fonction Publique de l'État
- Documentation française, avril 2003, Moderniser l'État : le cas de l'ENA
- La jaune et la rouge, Abolir les grands corps de l'État, X-Mines vivant au Massachusetts, Patrick Mehr compare la sélection des élites dans les deux pays. Selon lui, la meilleure manière d'encourager l'esprit d'initiative des jeunes Français les plus talentueux est de supprimer les grands corps de l'État
