= Jacques Villiers =

French aviation engineer

- Born: 26 August 1924; Vaucresson, Paris, France
- Died: 13 March 2012 (aged 87); Paris, France
- Citizenship: French
- Education: École polytechnique École nationale de l'aviation civile
- Scientific career
- Fields: Engineering (Aerospace)

Jacques Villiers (26 August 1924 – 13 March 2012) was a French aerospace engineer and public servant. He was the founder of the Centre d'études de la navigation aérienne (French air navigation center) and co-founder of the CAUTRA system (Système de contrôle automatisé du trafic aérien – automated air traffic control system), the computer system of the French air traffic management.

== Biography ==
Villiers was born in Vaucresson to a family from Lorraine. At a young age he joined the French resistance and the Maquis du Vercors.

After the Liberation of France, he graduated from the École polytechnique (1945–1948), after which he joined the Corps of Air navigation as an engineer. (It later became the Corps de l'aviation civile and then merged into the Corps des ponts). After graduating from the École nationale de l'aviation civile (1948–1950), he joined the Service de la navigation aérienne (SNAé) (Air navigation Service), where he campaigned in 1957 for France to modernize its air navigation system with new computing equipment. In 1960, following a reorganization of the SNAé, the Director of Air Navigation allowed him to create the Centre d'études de la navigation aérienne (CENA). He laid down the principles for automating the French Air Navigation System.

Villiers remained involved with the development of the system, designed to require as little instruction and effort from the operator as possible. Villiers invented the Digitatron, a touch input device which allows operators to modify the flight plans of aircraft.

It was also at this time that he developed the theory of filters, which separates the control actions on traffic flows in several filters whose time horizon is different. This theory foreshadowed modern versions of the air traffic control system.

Villiers was director of CENA from 1959 to 1970, where he had a paramount influence in the launching of the French air traffic control system, the CAUTRA (Automatic Air Traffic Coordinator) (versions I and II).

In 1970 Villiers became director of Northern region aeronautics, leaving the direction of CENA to his deputy, Dominique Alvarez. Villiers remained involved with CENA and furthered his interest in the automation control system, preparing several reports and numerous articles in journals or international conferences.

He was responsible for the general inspection of civil aviation and was on the Board of Directors of Aéroports de Paris. He was Chairman of the Board of ENAC from 1979 to 1989, a period during which he prepared the school's ENAC2000 plan. This plan provided the basis of a renovated and modern university. Villiers was also a member of the Académie de l'air et de l'espace.

In the early 2000s Villiers developed an original concept, the subliminal control, and transformed it into a new set of tools for air traffic control, the ERASMUS system. The Toolkit resulted in an ongoing R&D project, supported by the European Commission bearing the same name. The results of this project will form the basis of one of the most important tasks of the Single European Sky SESAR project. Villiers filed a patent for this system. He spent the last years of his life developing and promoting it with many articles and conferences.

== Bibliography ==
- In partnership with Paul Funel, Le transport aérien français : rapport au ministre d'État, ministre des Transports, La documentation française, Paris 1982 (ISBN 978-2110010148)
- Académie nationale de l'air et de l'espace and Lucien Robineau, Les français du ciel, dictionnaire historique, Le Cherche-Midi, June 2005, 782 p. (ISBN 2-7491-0415-7), p. 523, Villiers, Jacques
- Sophie Poirot-Delpech, Mémoire et histoires de l'automatisation du contrôle aérien : Sociobiographie du CAUTRA, L'Harmattan Editions, 11 September 2009
