= Corps des télécommunications =

French engineering organization

The Corps des télécommunications (Corps of Telecommunications) was a French Technical "grand corps de l'Etat". It is formed of the State Engineers of the Telecommunications.

It is interministerial (not attached to any specific Ministry or department within the administration) as its members are employed by a large number of Ministries. Their activities reach well beyond the traditional telecom sector, ranging from information technology management to conducting various public policies.

Many executive positions in France's telecoms and IT industry are held by State Engineers of the Telecommunications.

== History ==
The Corps of Telecommunications was created in 1967. It was formerly known as the Corps of Telegraphs, created in 1902.

Following the Decree (executive order) 2009-63 signed January 16, 2009, related to the specific statute of the engineers of Mines, the "corps des télécommunications" was merged with the "corps of mines".

== Admission and training ==
People entering the Corps are educated at the École nationale supérieure des télécommunications. Most of them are from École polytechnique; these are known as X-Telecom; the rest come from École Normale Supérieure, regular curriculum of the École nationale supérieure des télécommunications or via internal promotion.

Around 25 students are admitted yearly in the Corps of Telecommunications.

== Positions held ==
Members of the Corps of Telecommunication work both in the French administration and in the private sector.

There are about 1100 engineers currently in activity. A third is employed within the French Administration ou public services, a third in the France Telecom / Orange group and a third in other private companies.

Examples of employers in France include :

- French administration Departments, attached to Ministries (especially Economy & Finance, Defense, Homeland Affairs, Foreign Affairs and Relations with the European Union, Agriculture, Maritime Affairs, etc.)
- National regulation authorities (ARCEP for telecoms and postal services, CSA for broadcasting, CNIL for protection of privacy in IT, etc.)
- Public research institutes and labs (INRIA, Institut Télécom, CNRS, etc.)
- Public Broadcasting (France Télévision, RFO, Radio France, La Chaîne parlementaire, etc.)
- Private Telecom operators (Orange, the former public monopole, SFR, Bouygues Telecom, etc.)
- IT manufacturers and service providers (Alcatel-Lucent, Nortel, Bull, Capgemini, Thomson, Comverse, etc.)

Between 5 and 10% of State Engineers of Telecommunications have set up their own venture or are entrepreneurs.

Apart from the IT and telecom sectors, some engineers are also employed in the bank (including the national Banque de France cooperating within the European Central Bank) and finance industries for instance.

== Current or former members (examples) ==
- Didier Lombard, CEO of Orange
- Jean-Bernard Levy, CEO of Vivendi
- Michel Combes, previous CEO Europe Region of Vodafone, CEO of Alcatel-Lucent
- Pascale Sourisse, deputy CEO of Thales Group

== See also ==
- Corps of Mines
- Corps of INSEE
- Corps of Bridges and Roads
