= Nouvelles de l'estampe =

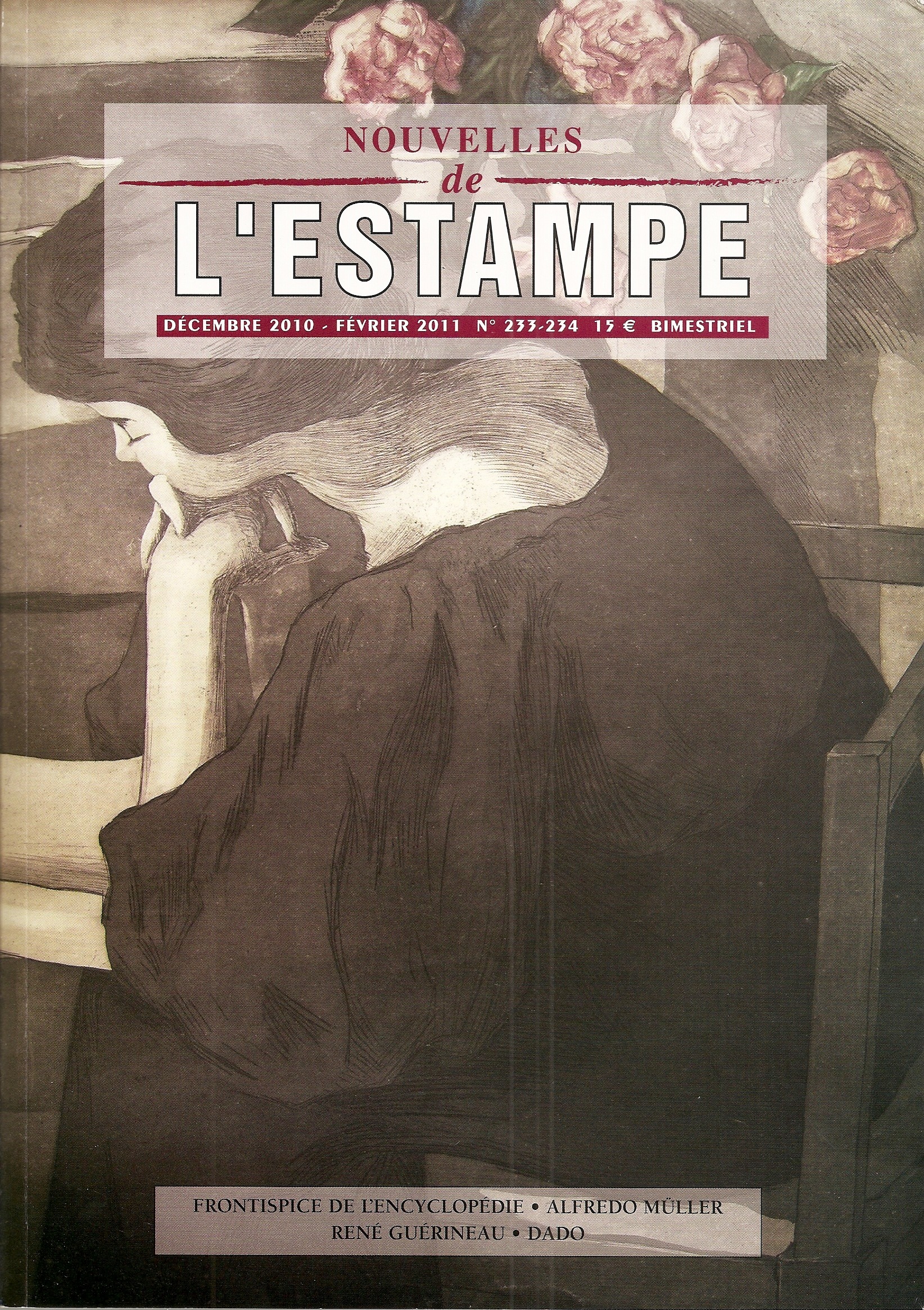
- "Nouvelles de l'estampe" n. 233-234 (March 2011)
- Discipline: Art, art history
- Language: French
- Edited by: Rémi Mathis

Publication details
- History: 1963–present
- Publisher: Comité national de la gravure française, supported by Bibliothèque nationale de France (France)
- Frequency: 5/year

Standard abbreviations
- ISO 4: Nouv. Estampe

Indexing
- ISSN: 0029-4888
- LCCN: 68127751
- OCLC no.: 4811391

Links
- Journal homepage

Nouvelles de l'estampe (in French : "News about prints") is a scholarly journal on prints (etchings, engravings, lithography, etc.). It is published by the Comité national de la gravure française and its office is at the prints department of the Bibliothèque nationale de France, which sponsors the journal. The journal is abstracted and indexed in the Bibliography of the History of Art and the Bibliographie de l'histoire de France.

== History ==
The journal was established in 1963 by Jean Adhémar, then curator of the prints department of the National Library. At that time, it was not a journal but just a few sheets presenting news on prints. Michel Melot, also a curator of the prints department, became editor in 1971 initiated the change to a scholarly journal, publishing studies on either old prints or contemporary creations. Part of the journal still presents news about exhibitions, new publications, etc.

== Editors-in-chief ==
The editors-in-chief of the journal:

- 1963–1971: Jean Adhémar
- 1971–1982: Michel Melot
- 1982–1988: Marcelle Elgrishi-Gautrot
- 1988–1991: Marianne Grivel
- 1991–2010: Gérard Sourd
- 2010–present: Rémi Mathis
