= AGATE (architecture framework) =

AGATE (Atelier de Gestion de l'ArchiTEcture des systèmes d'information et de communication) is a framework for modeling computer or communication systems architecture.

It is promoted by the Délégation Générale pour l'Armement (DGA), the French government agency which conducts development and evaluation programs for weapon systems for the French military. All major DGA weapons and information technology system procurements are required to document their proposed system architecture using the set of views prescribed in AGATE.

AGATE is similar to DoDAF, promoted by U.S. Department of Defense (DoD) or MODAF, promoted by UK Ministry of Defence (MoD). It is only available in French.

== Scope ==
AGATE defines architectural views for systems and systems of systems, covering:

- Stakes and objectives of the system
- Description of the related organizations
- processes and information flows
- Security requirements, in compliance with DGA policy
- Services of the system, and traceability with operational needs
- Logical architecture of the system
- Physical architecture of the systems, and hardware and software products used in this architecture
- Life cycle of the system

== AGATE Views ==
An AGATE model is organized into 5 views:

- Stakes, Objectives, and context about the system
- Business architecture: describes organizations and Business processes managed by the modelized Information system
- Service-oriented architecture: describes the Services of the system.
- Logical architecture of the system
- Physical architecture of the systems, and hardware and software products used in this architecture

== Representation ==
The AGATE meta-model is defined using a UML representation.

Visio elements for the AGATE representation are provided by the DGA.

== History ==
The first DGA initiative for a standardized French architecture framework was initialized in July 2001, under the acronym AMAC. The denomination was changed to AGATE in November of the same year.

- March 2004: Version 2.1
- December 2005: Version 3

== See also ==
- Délégation Générale pour l'Armement
- Department of Defense Architecture Framework (DoDAF)
- NATO Architecture Framework (NAF)
- British Ministry of Defence Architecture Framework (MODAF)
