= Yves Sillard =

French engineer and official (1936-2023)

- Born: 5 January 1936; Coutances, Normandy, France
- Died: 12 April 2023 (aged 87); Villeneuve-lès-Avignon, France
- Education: École Polytechnique; Supaéro
- Occupations: aerospace engineer, civil servant
- Known for: development of Ariane; leadership of CNES, IFREMER and the Direction générale de l'armement

Yves Sillard (January 5, 1936 – April 12, 2023) was a French aerospace engineer and high-ranking public servant who played a major role in the development of the French space program (Ariane). He headed the CNES, IFREMER, and the Délégation générale pour l'armement (General Directorate for Armament).

== Biography in short ==
Sillard was born in the Coutances area of Normandy, France. He studied at the École Massillon and entered École polytechnique in 1954. He joined the Corps de l'armement in 1957 and later obtained a degree from Supaéro in 1959. Sillard became the Secrétariat général à l'Aviation civile, Programme manager for Concorde in 1964 and from 1969 to 1971, he was head of the Guiana Space Centre.

Between 1976 and 1982, Sillard was the general director of the CNES, followed by the CEO position at IFREMER between 1982 and 1988. From 1989 to 1993, he was Délégué général pour l'armement and from 1994 to 1997, he was the CEO of Défense conseil international. From 1998 to 2001, Sillard was the assistant general secretary for scientific and environmental affairs at NATO. Afterwards, he became an active member of the Académie de l'air et de l'espace and promoted international collaboration.

== Bibliography ==
- Sillard, Yves (2007). Phénomènes aérospatiaux non identifiés: un défi à la science (English: Unidentified aerospace phenomena: a challenge to science). Collection Documents. Paris: le Cherche Midi. ISBN 978-2-7491-0892-6.
