= Francis Mer =

French businessman, industrialist and politician (1939–2023)

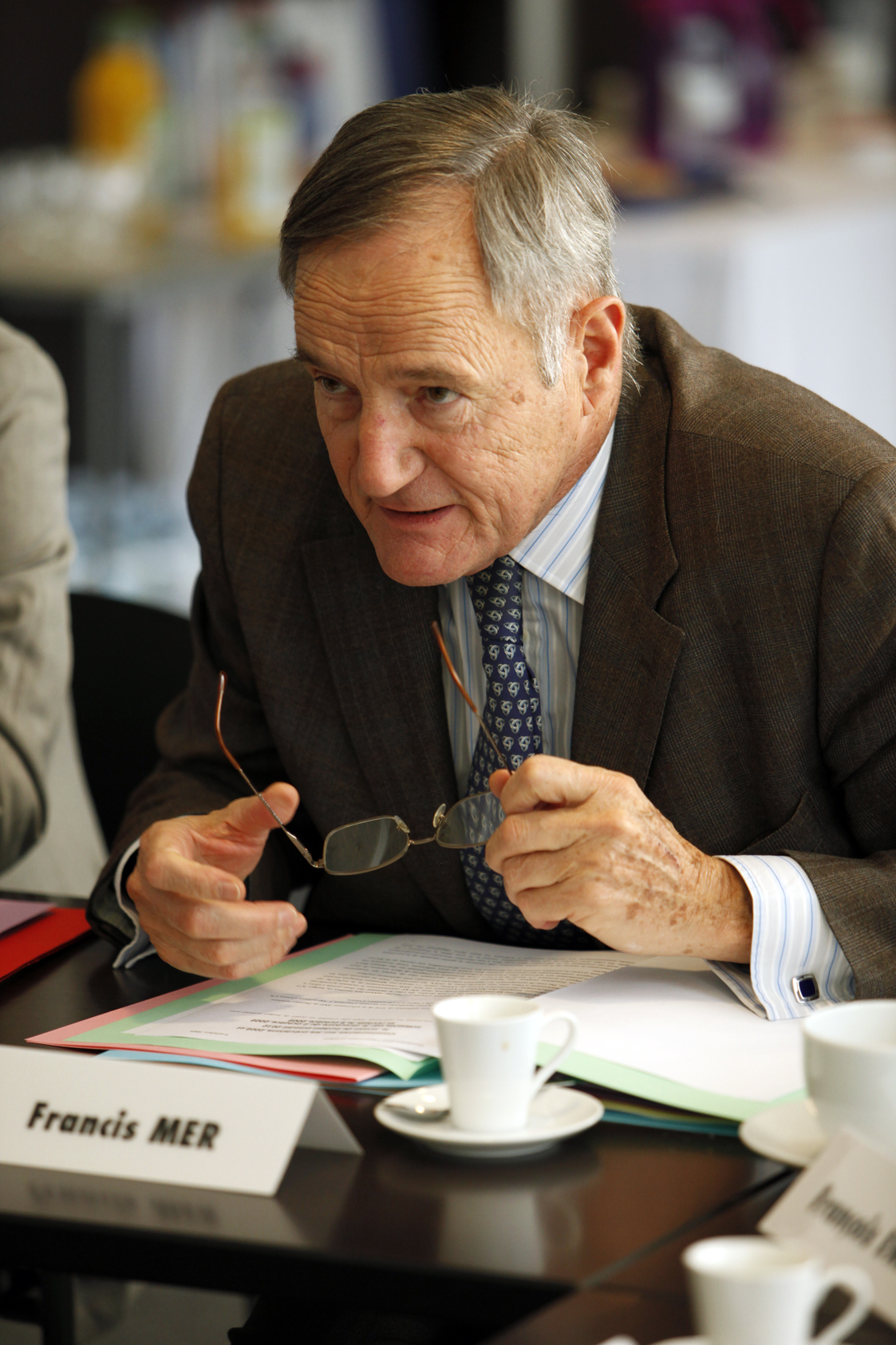
- Mer in 2009

Minister of the Economy of France
- In office 7 May 2002 – 30 March 2004
- President: Jacques Chirac
- Prime Minister: Jean-Pierre Raffarin
- Preceded by: Laurent Fabius
- Succeeded by: Nicolas Sarkozy

Personal details
- Born: Francis Paul Mer; 25 May 1939 Pau, France
- Died: 1 November 2023 (aged 84) Bourg-la-Reine, France
- Education: École polytechnique Mines ParisTech

Francis Mer (25 May 1939 – 1 November 2023) was a French businessman, industrialist and politician. An alumnus of the École polytechnique (class of 1959), and of the École des Mines de Paris, he was a member of the Corps des mines. Mer was hired in 1970 by the Saint-Gobain group. In 1982, he became chairman of the board of Pont-à-Mousson SA. In the 1980s, he joined the Saint-Simon Foundation think-tank.

Following the 1986 legislative elections and the nomination of the conservative Jacques Chirac as Prime Minister, he was nominated as president of the new Usinor group. He was reelected to his position in 1995, upon the group's privatization, and renamed the group Arcelor in 2002. From 2002 to 2004, he was Minister of Finances in Jean-Pierre Raffarin's conservative government.

From 2005, he sat on the board of directors of Vale Inco, which benefited from an important tax rebate to exploit a nickel mine in New Caledonia while he was finance minister.

In June 2009, he became chairman of the board of Safran.

In April 2011, due to the change of structure of Safran, Jean-Paul Herteman became CEO and Francis Mer became Vice Chairman.

Francis Mer died on 1 November 2023, at the age of 84.

== Notes ==
Political offices
Preceded by Laurent Fabius	Minister of the Economy, Finance and Industry; 2002–2004	Succeeded by Nicolas Sarkozy
