= Institut national des études territoriales =

Public administration school in Strasbourg, France

Coordinates: 48°42′05″N 7°54′20″E

- Type: Public
- Established: 1990
- Director: Véronique Robitaillie
- Administrative staff: 49
- Students: 825
- Location: Strasbourg, France
- Nickname: INET
- Website: www.inet.cnfpt.fr

The Institut national des études territoriales (INET, National Institute of Territorial Studies) is a French Public administration school. INET offers initial and continuing training to managerial staff of large local and regional authorities. Most of the students from the INET become directors or head of department (finance, budget, human resources) in towns of more than 80 000 inhabitants, departments or regions. Some of them start political careers and become French deputies or local politicians.

Created in 1990, the school is based in Strasbourg (France) and changed name in 1998.

== Recruitment ==
Entrance to INET is granted on a very competitive exam at the end of September. People generally take the exam after completing a master's degree at one of the Instituts d'études politiques (known as Sciences Po). Three different exams are organized each year:

- The "concours externe" (extern exam) for students,
- The "concours interne" (intern exam) for people who already worked 5 years as a local civil servant,
- The "troisième concours" (third exam) for people who already worked at least 8 years in a private company.

The exam is in two parts:

The written part includes

- An essay on public law
- An essay on the economy
- An essay on "general knowledge" (culture générale, extremely common in French competitive exams),
- A note de synthèse on a local policy subject (summarizing 40 to 70 pages of documents)
- A fifth exam chosen by the candidate among many different topics.

The oral exam, taken only by the candidates who obtain the highest marks in the written exam, consists of

- An oral examination on Public Finances
- An oral examination on Local administrative law
- An oral examination either on European law or on Employment law
- An oral examination to test the skills of the candidate in a foreign language (English, Spanish, Arabic, etc).
- A 45 minute long Grand Oral during which the jury can ask the candidate about very diverse topics such as history, local public policies or public law.

Usually 1000 students take the "concours externe" exam. After writing and oral exams, 30 only are selected to enter the school.

== Promotions ==
As in many French Public administration schools, academic years at INET are known as "promotions" and are named by the students after outstanding characters.

Name of promotions and number of students

Promotions of directors of administrative services	Concours externe	Concours interne	Troisième concours	Total
Paris locaux 1990 (1990-)	6	6	-	12
(1991-)			-	
Félicité de Lamennais (1992–1993)			-	
Gaston Defferre (1993–1994)			-	
(1994-)			-	
François Mauriac (1995-)	10	10	-	20
À l'échelle humaine (1996–1997)	10	10	-	20
(1997-)	10	10	-	20
François Rabelais (1998–1999)	10	10	-	20
Mirabeau (1999–2000)	15	15	-	30
Louise Weiss (2000–2001)	20	20	-	40
Jean Vilar (2001–2002)	20	20	-	40
Terres des Hommes (2002–2003)	24	25	-	49
Olympe de Gouges (2003–2004)	25	25	-	50
Vercors (2004–2005)	23	22	5	50
Cervantes (2005–2006)	27	27	6	60
Théodore Monod (2006–2007)	27	27	6	60
Lucie Aubrac (2007–2008)	27	27	6	60
Galileo (2008–2009)	29	29	7	65
Aimé Césaire (2009–2010)	32	31	7	70
Robert Schuman (2010–2011)	30	29	6	65
Salvador Allende (2011–2012)	30	29	5	64

Promotions of head librarians	Concours externe	Concours interne	Total
(2003)	8	2	10
(2004)	8	2	10
Georges Perec (2005–2007)	8	2	10
Flora Tristan (2006–2007)	8	2	10
Jean-Pierre Vernant (2007–2008)	18	6	24

Promotions of museum curators	Concours externe	Concours interne	Total
Hiéronymus Bosch (2002)	11	2	13
Jacques Tati (2003)	11	2	13
Niki de St Phalle (2004–2006)	14	1	15
Georges Meliès (2005–2007)	10	2	12
Erik Satie (2006–2007)	11	2	13
Saint-John Perse (2007–2008)	9	1	10

== Alumni ==
- Brice Hortefeux, former French minister
- Marie-Luce Penchard, former French minister
- Jean-Jacques Hyest, French conservative senator
- Jean-Christophe Parisot, French political scientist
- Bernard Roman, French socialist MP

== See also ==
- Sciences Po Paris
- École nationale d'administration
- École Polytechnique
- École Normale Supérieure
- HEC Paris
- Oxbridge
- Golden triangle
- Ivy League
