= École nationale supérieure de techniques avancées Bretagne =

French naval and marine engineering school

Coordinates: 48°25′8″N 4°28′21″W

ENSTA Bretagne
- École Nationale Supérieure de Techniques Avancées de Bretagne
- Former names: ENSIETA
- Type: Public; under military supervision
- Established: 1971; 55 years ago
- President: Bruno Gruselle
- Location: Brest, Brittany, France
- Website: www.ensta-bretagne.fr

The École Nationale Supérieure de Techniques Avancées de Bretagne (French pronunciation: [ekɔl nɑsjɔnal sypeʁjœʁ də tɛknik(z‿)avɑ̃se də bʁətaɲ]; transl. "National Institute of Advanced Technologies of Brittany"), often referred as ENSTA Bretagne and formerly ENSIETA, is one of the 207 French engineering schools accredited on 1 September 2017 to deliver engineering diplomas (French grande école of engineering). The ENSTA Bretagne is a higher education establishment and a research centre run under the supervision of the French Ministry of Armed Forces which governs a total of 4 engineering schools: École Polytechnique, ENSTA ParisTech, ENSTA Bretagne and ISAE-Supaero. It is the most prestigious engineering school in France which deals with marine and naval engineering.

Moreover, ENSTA Bretagne is an applied school for the École Polytechnique, because of its excellence in lots of strategic fields. The school gets a specific partnership with IMT Atlantique, the second Institut Mines-Télécom of France while the best one is Telecom Paris.

Every year, it trains approximately 180 general engineers and generally recruits its students through the Concours Commun Mines Ponts competitive entrance exams. ENSTA Bretagne is partly a military academy for engineers because it trains engineers for the armed forces, although nowadays the majority (80%) of trainees are civilians. The ENSTA Bretagne is located in Brest, France.

== Background ==
=== History ===
Created in 1819, the Maistrance (petty officer) schools were reorganized over the years into two levels of training. The schools of higher education, situated in Brest and Toulon took the name of “Ecoles Normales de Maistrance” in 1868. When the school in Toulon closed, Brest became the Ecole Superieure de Maistrance in 1877 then the Ecole Technique Superieure des Constructions Navales in 1912. The Ecole Technique Supérieure de l’Artillerie Navale was created in Toulon in 1928. These two schools form the Ecoles Techniques Superieures de la Marine (ETSM). They were accredited to deliver engineering diplomas in 1934. In 1841, the Toulon school was closed and the Brest Ecole Technique Supérieure des Constructions Navales was the only surviving school. It joined forces with the graduate schools in land armaments and aeronautics in 1971 to form the Ecole Nationale Supérieure des Ingénieurs des Etudes et Techniques d’Armement (ENSIETA). Instituted by decree on 17 June 1975, at first it taught on 2 sites, Brest and Arcueil, before merging onto the Brest site in 1986.

Originally exclusively dedicated to training military engineers to the requirements of the French Ministry of Defense, the school was progressively opened up to civilian students in 1988. The number of civilian students increased dramatically in the 1990s in parallel with the military cutbacks linked to restructuring plans.

In December 2010, ENSIETA changed its name to ENSTA Bretagne and became a founder member of the ENSTA Group along with ENSTA ParisTech. This group aims to receive other high-level student engineers as part of its development plans.

=== The strategic partnership IMT-Atlantique-ENSTA Bretagne ===
On 2 February 2017, the directors of IMT Atlantique and ENSTA Bretagne signed a partnership agreement between the two establishments in the presence of the Minister for Defense, Jean-Yves Le Drian. The agreement aims to establish coordinated activities in the short and long term, covering training (especially through student exchanges between the 2 schools), research, innovation, internationalization and the creation of an engineering center of excellence and reference.

== Network ==
ENSTA Bretagne is an administrator of the « France Energies Marines » and competitivity clusters « Mer Bretagne Atlantique » and « iD4car ». ENSTA Bretagne is also an administrator of the Université Bretagne-Loire (UBL). ENSTA Bretagne is also a member of the competitivity clusters “Images et Réseaux” and “EMC2”. Finally, since December 2010, the school is a founder member of the ENSTA Group.

== Training ==
=== General Engineer ===
There are generally 180 students in a year (85% civilian and 15% military) who are mostly recruited through the Mines Télécom competitive entry exams. ENSTA Bretagne engineering degrees are accredited by the Commission des Titres d’Ingénieur (CTI) and have been certified EURACE (European label given by the CTI).

The first year of studies is followed by all the students in the school in general subjects at a graduate level (mathematics, informatics, mechanics, electronics, management, finance, scientific studies etc.)

Eight core subjects and 21 profiles are then proposed from the second year onwards

- Observation Systems and Artificial Intelligence
- Security and Digital System
- Robotics
- Naval architecture and offshore engineering
- Vehicle Architecture and Modeling
- Pyrotechnics Systems
- Hydrography and Oceanography
- Engineering and Management Organizations since 2010

=== Apprentice engineers ===
Since 2006, ENSTA Bretagne has proposed a 3-year apprenticeship general engineer course. There are 3 specializations (Embedded Systems, Vehicle Architecture and Naval Platforms) and a complementary course (Company Sciences).

=== Masters ===
- International Master of Automobile Engineering
- Master of Maritime Engineering
- Master of Hydrography Category A(FIG OHI)
- Master of Mobile Robotics – Application in Marine Robotics
- Master of Architecture and Security of Electronic Systems and Software

=== Advanced Masters ===
These training courses (of a 6-year post Baccalaureate level) are accredited by the Conference des Grandes Ecoles:

- Pyrotechnics and Propulsion
- Specialist in Renewable Marine Energies
- Marine Engineering/Offshore and Naval Architecture, »Offshore and Naval Engineering » or « Naval Architecture and Engineering: Ship Design » options
- Maritime Project Management
- Location and Multi-Sensor Systems Engineering

=== PhDs ===
Every year, ENSTA Bretagne receives around one hundred PhD students (8 years post Baccalaureate level) in its research departments. ENSTA Bretagne is co-accredited to award a doctorate in two doctoral schools:

- UBL – Sciences for Engineers
- UBL- Maths ICST

== Student life ==
ENSTA Bretagne and the students through their student union, propose sporting events, sailing, music, theater, student evening concerts etc.

The student union (BDE) runs all the extra curricula activities proposed to the students: evenings, sporting events, galas, the integration weekend (welcoming the new students), the student/teacher day etc. It organizes events in the student building and common room and coordinates the clubs.

The student sports union (BDS) proposes numerous sporting activities: rugby, handball, volleyball, football, basketball, swimming, fencing, table tennis, badminton, judo, diving, cycling, sailing etc. which can mostly be carried out using the school’s equipment and facilities. ENSTA Bretagne participates in the Ministry of Defense graduate schools sports tournament (the TSGED) which takes place every year on the Ecole Polytechnique campus (at Palaiseau), Croisière EDHEC campus etc.

== Research ==
Research at ENSTA Bretagne, the reference point for the training, is in three departments. It answers two main objectives:

- further knowledge in the fields of expertise of the school whilst satisfying the requirements of the industry stakeholders and the Ministry of Armed Forces ;
- ensure cutting edge scientific training for the student engineers, inspiring their curiosity, initiative and creativity

ENSTA Bretagne also has joint laboratories with Thales, Naval Group and IxBlue.

=== Mechanics Department ===
The IRDL Laboratory (the Institut de Recherche Dupuy de Lôme, FRE CNRS 3744) is composed of lecturers from ENSTA Bretagne, ENIB and the two universities of Western Brittany, UBO and UBS. Their work covers the science and technology of mechanics and materials. The research is carried out in close cooperation with companies in the automotive, energy, aeronautical, health, and transport industries and sectors which interact with the marine environment (naval construction, offshore, renewable marine energies).

=== The Information and Communication Science and Technology Department (ICST) ===
The Lab-STICC (the French acronym for the Information and Communication Science, Technology and Knowledge Laboratory, UMR CNRS 6285) comprises 180 lecturers from IMT-Atlantique Bretagne – Pays de Loire, UBO, UBS (the University of Lorient-Vannes), ENIB and ENSTA Bretagne.

ENSTA Bretagne is the 3rd most important contributor to the laboratory. It is active in 11 of the 17 themed research teams.

=== Department of Social and Human Sciences (SHS) ===
The Training Research Center (CRF-EA 1410) is composed of 30 lecturers from CNAM Paris (the main establishment), Centrale-Supelec, the University of Évry and ENSTA Bretagne. The SHS research activities are a logical extension of engineer training. They cover the knowledge of engineers and executives, their training and professional socialization, as well as the social, ethical and scientific issues of their activities.
