= Direction générale de l'armement =

French defence procurement agency

DGA logo

The Direction générale de l'armement (French pronunciation: [diʁɛksjɔ̃ ʒeneʁal də laʁməmɑ̃], lit. 'Directorate General of Armament', abbr. DGA), established in 1961, is the French Government defence procurement and technology agency, responsible within the Ministry of Armed Forces for project management, development, and purchase of weapon systems for the French military. The DGA's mission is to prepare the future of French defence systems, equip the French Armed Forces, as well as to promote French defence industry exports.

== Armament project coordination ==
The DGA coordinates armament projects with the industry in France, within Europe, but also with customers for export. Together with the Europe of Defence organisation, the DGA promotes the development of armament projects in co-operation and contributes to the development of the European Defence Agency. Fifteen cooperative armament projects are under way. The OCCAr (Joint Organisation of Co-operation as regards Armament) ensures the control of six projects intended to equip the French force, inter allia: combat Tiger helicopter, ground-to-air missiles short Roland/Frole range, Cobra counter-battery radar, family of ground-to-air systems future (FSAF), A400M military transport aircraft, PAAMS anti-aircraft system.

== Other activities ==
=== Testing and expertise ===
The DGA also undertakes the testing and assessment of equipment and military technologies. Test centres are distributed across France to carry out studies in advanced technologies: DGA Hydrodynamics, DGA Aero-engine Testing, DGA CBRN Defence, DGA Information superiority, DGA Land Systems, DGA Missiles Testing, DGA Naval Systems, DGA Flight Testing, DGA Aeronautical Systems, DGA Engineering & Integration. These services contribute to the validation of industrial equipment, but also to the proving of military systems for the programme directorates. Since 2004 DGA, has been organised into two sub-directorates for the coordination of projects dealing respectively with the inter-systems technical approach (Service of architecture inter-systems) and with technological developments (responsible for domains).

=== Engineering schools ===
In addition, the DGA supervises engineering schools that operate under the scrutiny of the Ministry of defence (École polytechnique, ENSTA ParisTech, Supaéro, ENSTA Bretagne, ENSICA). The high-level military staff of DGA, the Corps of Armament whose members are the ingénieurs de l'armement (IA, literally, "Armament Engineers"), are commissioned officers, who are generally graduates of the École polytechnique, then the ENSTA or Institut supérieur de l'aéronautique et de l'espace. The main part of the engineers, the ingénieurs des études et techniques d'armement (IETA, literally, "weaponry studies and technics engineers") are graduates of the ENSIETA or ENSICA.

=== Naval building ===
The DGA also formerly had a division for building warships, the Direction des constructions navales ("Directorate of Naval Construction"), now formed into a partly state-owned corporation, initially named DCNS in 2007 and rebranded Naval Group in 2017.

== Ranks within the Corps de l'armement ==
Officers of the Corps de l'armement have a unique rank structure.

- Ingénieur, (1er échelon) ("Engineer", first level, equivalent to a Sous-lieutenant)
- Ingénieur, (2e et 3e échelon) ("Engineer", second and third level, equivalent to a Lieutenant)
- Ingénieur, (4e au 9e échelon) ("Engineer", from fourth to ninth level, equivalent to a Capitaine)
- Ingénieur principal ("Lead Engineer", equivalent to a Commandant)
- Ingénieur en chef ("Chief Engineer" equivalent to a Lieutenant-Colonel before serving two years in this rank)
- Ingénieur en chef ("Chief Engineer" equivalent to a Colonel after serving two or more years in this rank)
- Ingénieur général de 2e classe ("Engineer-General, Second Class", equivalent to a Général de brigade)
- Ingénieur général de 1er classe ("Engineer-General, First Class", equivalent to a Général de division)
- Ingénieur général hors classe ("Engineer-General Beyond Class", equivalent to a Général de corps d'armée). There are at least three (one for each service branch) but usually others are appointed to run the main divisions within the DGA.
- Ingénieur général de classe exceptionnelle ("Engineer-General, Exceptional Class", equivalent to a Général d'armée). There is usually only one: the titular Délégué Général pour l'Armement (the head of DGA).

Officers of the Corps des ingénieurs des études et techniques de l'armement have also a unique rank structure.

- Ingénieur, (1er échelon) ("Engineer", first level, equivalent to a Sous-lieutenant)
- Ingénieur, (2e au 5e échelon) ("Engineer", from second to fifth level, equivalent to a Lieutenant)
- Ingénieur, (6e au 10e échelon) ("Engineer", from sixth to tenth level, equivalent to a Capitaine)
- Ingénieur principal ("Lead Engineer", equivalent to a Commandant)
- Ingénieur en chef de 2e classe ("Chief Engineer, Second Class" equivalent to a Lieutenant-Colonel)
- Ingénieur en chef de 1er classe ("Chief Engineer, First Class" equivalent to a Colonel)
- Ingénieur général de 2e classe ("Engineer-General, Second Class", equivalent to a Général de brigade)
- Ingénieur général de 1er classe ("Engineer-General, First Class", equivalent to a Général de division)

== See also ==
- AGATE, the architecture framework promoted by the DGA
