= Corps of Bridges, Waters and Forests =

Technical Grand Corps of the French State

The Corps des Ingénieurs des Ponts, des Eaux et des Forêts (French pronunciation: [kɔʁ dez‿ɛ̃ʒenjœʁ de pɔ̃ dez‿o e de fɔʁɛ], in English "Corps of the Engineers of Bridges, Waters and Forests") is a technical Grand Corps of the French State (grand corps de l'État). Its members, called ingénieurs des ponts, des eaux et des forêts (nicknamed IPEF), are senior civil servants and top-level engineers, mainly employed by the French Ministry of Ecological Transition and by the French Ministry of Agriculture, but they can also work for every French Ministries, public establishments, or public compagnies. Thanks to its history and its selective recruitment policy, the Corps des IPEF enjoys considerable prestige within France's senior civil services, as the Corps des mines and the Corps de l'armement.

== Recruitment and training ==
Most of the IPEF are recruited from École polytechnique (around 50%), where they are selected based on their final ranking, and there exist several competitive entrance exams for former students from AgroParisTech, from the Écoles normales supérieures, or from other French Grandes écoles such as École des ponts ParisTech, CentraleSupélec and École des mines. A special entrance exam was recently opened for PhD holders but it offers a limited number of places. In addition, it is possible for other civil servants to join the Corps des IPEF after passing internal exams so as to widen their career perspectives.

People entering the Corps des IPEF (around 60 each year) are mostly trained at AgroParisTech and École des ponts ParisTech, but some members also attend formation in specific fields in French or abroad universities. After 1 or 2 years of training including an Executive Master in public affairs, several engineers start a PhD during 3 years in a French laboratory, while the others take their first operational position in the French administration.

Many executive positions in France's industries and administration are held by these engineers. Being admitted to the Corps des IPEF is still considered a significant fast-track for executive careers.

== Missions ==
According to the Corps statutes, every IPEF participate, under the authority of the competent ministers, in the design, development, implementation and evaluation of public policies, particularly in areas relating to:

- climate,
- energy demand,
- sustainable regional planning and development,
- housing and urban development,
- transport,
- agricultural and forestry development,
- management and preservation of natural land and maritime areas and resources,
- food and agro-industry.

They may perform management, supervisory, monitoring, inspection, study, expert appraisal, public policy evaluation, teaching and research functions, including in international organizations.

In particular, they can be in charge of research and teaching activities in these areas. In this case, they are assimilated as permanent researchers.

== Organization and structure ==
The Corps is led by the chef de corps ("chief of corps"). All members are divided into 3 grades, corresponding to career advancement and levels of responsibility:

- ingénieur ("engineer")
- ingénieur en chef ("chief engineer")
- ingénieur général ("general engineer")

There also exist a temporary grade for newly recruited engineers still in training: ingénieur-élève ("engineer-student").

== History ==
The Corps des IPEF resulted from the merger in 2009 of two Grands Corps, namely the Corps des Ingénieurs des Ponts et Chaussées (IPC) (in English "Corps of the engineers of Bridges and Roads") and the Corps des Ingénieurs du Génie rural, des Eaux et des Forêts (IGREF) (in English "Corps of the engineers of Rural Engineering, Waters and Forests"). They used to recruit their members in École polytechnique, AgroParisTech and École des ponts ParisTech.

Even before, the Corps des IPC absorbed several formers Corps including civil aviation engineers, geography engineers and meteorological engineers, while the Corps des IGREF absorbed the Corps of the engineers of rural engineering and the Corps of the engineers of waters and forests.

== Important former or current members ==
- Paul-Louis Arslanian
- Henri Becquerel
- Christian Beullac
- Fulgence Bienvenüe
- Jean-Baptiste Biot
- Augustin-Louis Cauchy
- Gaspard-Gustave de Coriolis
- Henry Darcy
- Jules Dupuit
- Augustin-Jean Fresnel
- Charles de Freycinet
- Louis Joseph Gay-Lussac
- Pierre-Simon Girard
- Philippe LeBon
- Joseph Liouville
- Étienne-Louis Malus
- Pierre Méchain
- Charles Joseph Minard
- Claude-Louis Navier
- Jean Peyrelevade
- Gaspard de Prony
- Marie François Sadi Carnot (former President of the French Republic)
- Bernardin de Saint-Pierre
- Louis Vicat
- Jacques Villiers
- François Philippe Voisin
- Michel Virlogeux
- Jean Tirole (Nobel prize in economics)
- Marion Guillou
- Élisabeth Borne (former Prime Minister of French Republic)
