= Corps de l'INSEE =

The Corps of INSEE (Corps de l'INSEE) is a technical Grand corps de l'Etat with the National Institute of Statistics and Economic Studies (INSEE).

== Service ==
Its members are public servants known as Administrateurs de l'INSEE. Most of them work for INSEE or in the French Ministry of the Economy.

== Education ==
People entering the Corps are educated at the École nationale de la statistique et de l'administration économique−ENSAE. Most of them are from the École polytechnique and are known as X-INSEE. The rest come from the École Normale Supérieure, the regular curriculum of the ENSAE (École nationale de la statistique et de l'administration économique), ENSAI or internal promotion.
