= ENSTA Paris =

French public engineering grande école

Coordinates: 48.834246°N 2.283331°E

ENSTA
- École nationale supérieure de techniques avancées
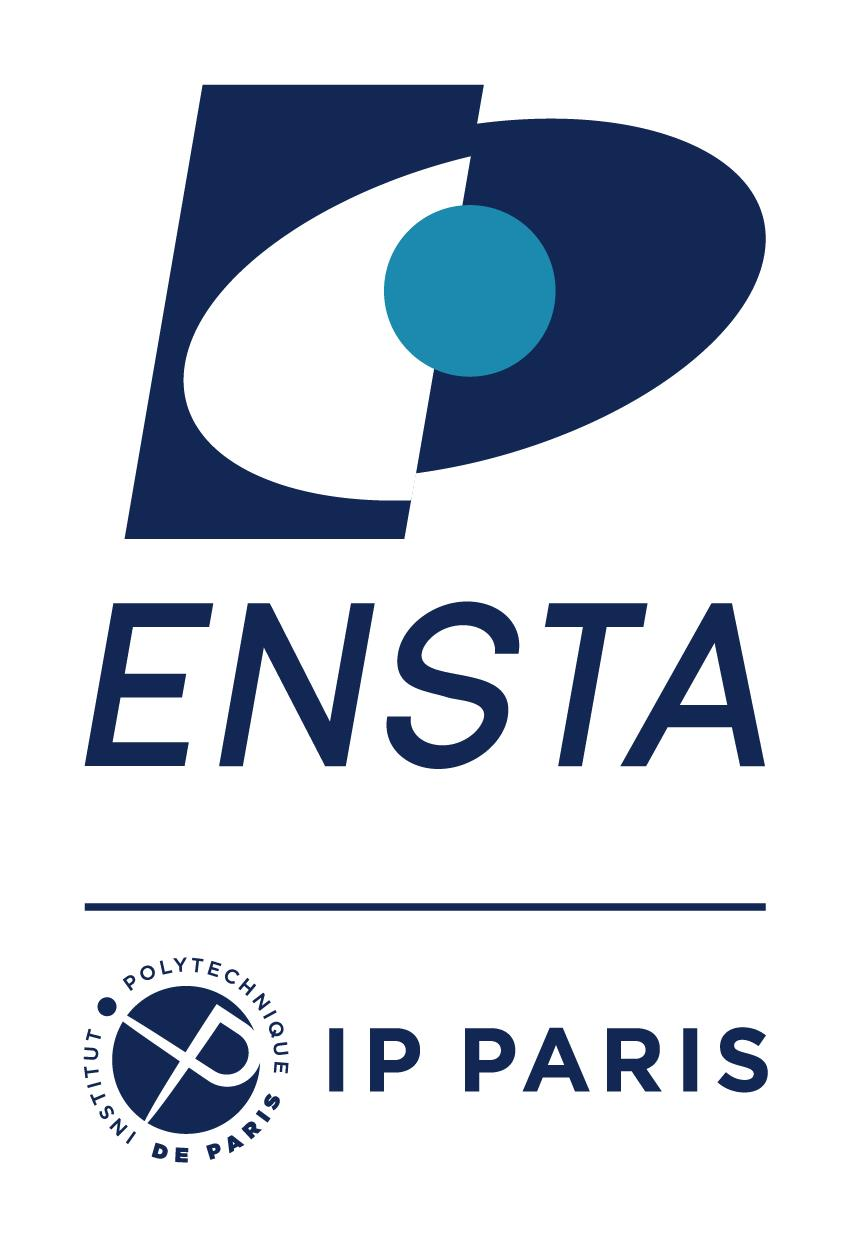
- Former name: ENSTA Paris (2010–2024)
- Type: Grande école; public scientific, cultural and professional establishment (EPSCP), constituted as a grand établissement; under the supervision of the Ministry of the Armed Forces
- Established: 1970; 56 years ago
- Parent institution: Institut Polytechnique de Paris
- Affiliations: Conférence des Grandes écoles
- Director: Estelle Iacona
- Faculty: More than 200 teaching staff and teacher-researchers
- Students: 2,351 (2025–2026)
- Location: Palaiseau and Brest, France
- Campus: Paris-Saclay (Palaiseau) and Brest
- Website: www.ensta.fr/en

The École nationale supérieure de techniques avancées (ENSTA) is a French public grande école of engineering. From 2010 to 2024, the institution was known as ENSTA Paris. It is an establishment-component of the Institut Polytechnique de Paris and is under the supervision of the French Ministry of the Armed Forces. The school operates campuses in Palaiseau and Brest.

The current ENSTA resulted from the merger of ENSTA Paris and ENSTA Bretagne, which took effect on 1 January 2025. Under French Decree No. 2024-1081, ENSTA succeeded to the missions of ENSTA Bretagne and operates on two sites, in Palaiseau and Brest.

ENSTA's institutional origins date to 1741, when Henri-Louis Duhamel du Monceau established a school for the theoretical education of French naval shipbuilders. The ENSTA institution was created in 1970 through the consolidation of several engineering schools. It had 2,351 students in the 2025–2026 academic year.

== History ==
The institution's origins are traced to 1741, when Henri-Louis Duhamel du Monceau, inspector general of the French Navy, established a school to provide shipbuilders with theoretical instruction in mathematics and physics. According to ENSTA's institutional history, the school was initially established in Toulon and was later transferred to Paris, where it was housed in the Louvre. It closed during the Seven Years' War and reopened in 1765 after Duhamel du Monceau persuaded the French government to restore it as part of a reorganization of the navy. He continued to direct the school until his death.

The School of Student Engineer Constructors, as it was known, was closed in 1793 during the French Revolution. It reopened in 1795 as an application school for the Ecole Polytechnique. Later on, it became known as Ecole nationale supérieure du Génie maritime (National Higher College of Maritime Engineering).

In 1970, the Délégation générale pour l'Armement (Arms administration of the Ministry of Defence) merged the school with three of its other establishments:

- the École nationale supérieure des Poudres (Powders and explosives institute)

- the École nationale supérieure de l'Armement (Arms engineering institute)

- the École des Ingénieurs hydrographes de la Marine (Hydrographic institute).

This formed the École nationale supérieure de Techniques avancées (ENSTA), the role of which is to train engineers in the naval, mechanical, nuclear, chemical, electronic and related fields. The scientific skills of each of the founding institutes survive in the broad range of research disciplines covered at ENSTA, as well as in the more general nature of its teaching and the variety of specialities offered to the students.

The history of the institution's Brest predecessor follows a separate line. Schools of maistrance were established in Brest, Rochefort and Toulon in 1819; the Brest school later developed through successive reorganizations and became ENSIETA in 1971, before taking the name ENSTA Bretagne in 2010.

In December 2010, ENSIETA became ENSTA Bretagne and joined the ENSTA group. The existing ENSTA was then renamed ENSTA Paris.

=== Merger in 2025 ===
On 1 January 2025, ENSTA Paris and ENSTA Bretagne merged to form a single institution, ENSTA. The merger was formalized by French Decree No. 2024-1081 of 29 November 2024, which took effect on 1 January 2025. Under the decree, ENSTA assumed ENSTA Bretagne's missions, and the combined institution was established across two sites, in Palaiseau and Brest. The decree also identifies ENSTA as an establishment-component of the Institut Polytechnique de Paris.

On 2 May 2025, Estelle Iacona was appointed Director General of ENSTA by presidential decree. She took up the post on 12 May 2025.

ENSTA is a public scientific, cultural and professional establishment constituted as a grand établissement. It remains under the supervision of the Ministry of the Armed Forces.

== Rankings ==
The rankings below predate the 2025 merger. The national ranking refers to the former ENSTA Paris, while the international rankings are for the Institut Polytechnique de Paris rather than ENSTA alone.

National ranking (ranked as ENSTA Paris for its Master of Sciences in Engineering)

Name	Year	Rank
DAUR Rankings	2022	4 ea

International ranking (ranked as Institut Polytechnique de Paris)

Name	Year	Rank (World)	Rank (France)
General ranking
CWUR	2022-2023	43	5
QS World University Rankings	2023	48	2
Shanghai Ranking	2022	301-400	13-16
Times Higher Education	2022	91	3
Employability ranking
QS Graduate Employability Rankings 2022	2022	12	1

== Academics ==
ENSTA is a French grande école of engineering and a component institution of the Institut Polytechnique de Paris. It provides engineering education and conducts research in fields including defense and security, transportation, energy, maritime engineering, digital technology and related areas.

=== Engineering programmes ===
From the 2026 academic year, ENSTA's engineering programmes include a general engineering programme offered at its Palaiseau and Brest campuses; a defence and security engineering programme developed jointly with ISAE-SUPAERO and delivered across the Brest, Paris-Saclay and Toulouse campuses; and specialized engineering programmes offered through work-study arrangements. The school also offers master's degrees, specialized master's programmes and doctoral programmes.

The former ENSTA Paris engineering programme continues for students in its transition period; the school's website states that its final class is expected to graduate in 2028.

== Notable alumni ==
The following list includes alumni of ENSTA and its predecessor institutions, including ENSTA Paris.

=== Military and politics ===
- Alain Bouquin, General Commander of the French Foreign Legion
- Eugène Deloncle
- Édouard Jean Baptiste Milhaud
- Guillaume Delcourt

=== Engineering and industry ===
- Louis-Émile Bertin
- Valérie Cornetet
- Henri Dupuy de Lôme
- Jacques-Noël Sané
- Léonce Verny
- Ernest Mercier, former President of Alstom
- Jerome Guillen, former President of Automotive at Tesla, Inc.
- Fatim-Zahra Ammor Moroccan Minister

=== Chemistry ===
- Paul Marie Eugène Vieille

=== Physics ===
- Gérard Albert Mourou, Physics Nobel Prize 2018
- François Forget, Astrophysicist and Member of the French Academy of Sciences
- Paul-Henri Rebut, Physicist, designer and Director of JET nuclear fusion facility, Chevalier de l'Ordre national du Mérite, Chevalier de la Légion d'honneur, Hannes Alfvén Prize and Member of the French Academy of Sciences

=== Mathematics ===
- Charles Dupin

=== Computer Science ===
- François Chollet
