= Corps des Mines =

Corps of French civil servants

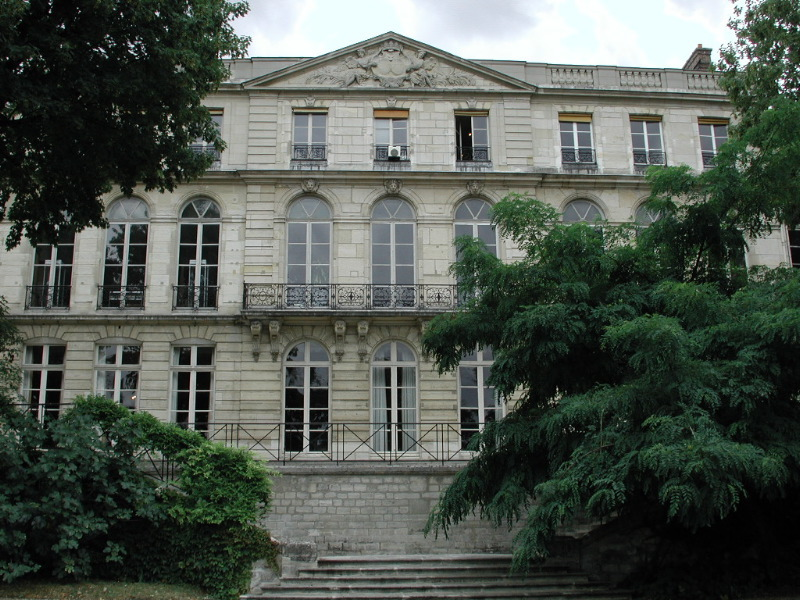
Parkside façade of the Hôtel de Vendôme, now home of Mines Paris – PSL, where members of the Corps des Mines have received their initial training since 1817

The Corps des Mines (French pronunciation: [kɔʁ de min]) is a subgroup (French: corps) of the French civil service, one of so-called grands corps de l'État which have long enjoyed elite status among French public employees. For about two centuries it has been considered foremost among the corps techniques de l'État, namely those corps de fonctionnaires that recruit their members from science, technology, engineering, and mathematics training tracks.

Members of the Corps des Mines receive an engineering degree upon entry into the Corps and are known as ingénieurs des Mines (lit. 'mining engineers'), or colloquially as corpsards des Mines. Their careers typically combine government roles with executive positions in large French companies.

The Corps des Mines is under the authority to the Ministry of Economics and Finance. Its higher body is the Conseil Général de l'Économie, de l'Industrie, de l'Énergie et des Technologies, in shorthand Conseil Général de l'Économie and abbreviated as CGE, which in 2009 replaced the longstanding Conseil Général des Mines (CGM) established in 1810. The CGE is an oversight body of senior members of the Corps des Mines and is formally chaired by the competent minister; The Service du Conseil Général de l'Économie, de l'Industrie, de l'Énergie et des Technologies, known before 2009 as the Service du Conseil Général des Mines, is an administrative unit that supports the CGE's work as well as the training and career management of the ingénieurs des Mines.

== History ==
=== Background and establishment ===
The Corps des Mines emerged in the third quarter of the 18th century in a context of gradual specialization within the French state's civilian bureaucracy, echoing experiences elsewhere in Europe and especially the establishment of the Prussian bureaucracy under Frederick William I (r. 1713-1740). The model of a corps of state engineers was first established in the Kingdom of France with the Corps des Ponts et Chaussées, which from 1747 on relied on a dedicated higher education institution, later known as the École Nationale des Ponts et Chaussées. Meanwhile during the 18th century, the mining sector developed an increasingly specialized body of knowledge, particularly in the German-speaking world where it was more advanced than in France. Milestones of that development included the establishment in 1762 by the Habsburg monarchy of the Mining Academy in Schemnitz (now Banská Štiavnica in Slovakia), and that in 1765 by the Electorate of Saxony of a similar Mining Academy (German: Bergakademie) in Freiberg, still extant as the Freiberg University of Mining and Technology. The Freiberg Academy served as a direct inspiration for the establishment of the first École des Mines in France, in 1783, which a contemporary described as intended to train "engineers and inspectors that would be at the same time physicists, metallurgists, architects, mechanics, mathematicians, geologists, and good managers".

The formation of a self-conscious community of state mining engineers took place gradually and on a small scale. In 1769, an administrative unit focused on mines was first established within the French civil service. On 21 March 1781, a royal decision of Louis XVI established four positions of inspecteurs des Mines. These engineers first referred to their own group as "corps des Mines" in the early phase of the French Revolution, in a memorandum to the National Assembly on 2 June 1790. Legislation of the National Convention in 1794 created the Agence des Mines and re-established the École des Mines in Paris, with a mandate to recruit its engineers from École Polytechnique. That year, scholar Charles Coquebert de Montbret, who had just been appointed by the Agence des Mines as editor of its newly established journal, wrote: "there needs to be a Corps of engineers in the state's service, in order to mobilize technology and science for the benefit of the public good, and to disseminate knowledge."

=== 19th century ===
On 18 November 1810, an Imperial Decree of Napoleon gave permanent status to the "Corps impérial des ingénieurs des Mines" and established the Conseil Général des Mines as a collective oversight body of senior members of the Corps. That same year, new legislation established the legal regime of mining concessions that the ingénieurs des Mines would manage on behalf of the French state.

Initially, the Corps des Mines was second in status to the older Corps des Ponts et Chaussées, so that the best-ranked students exiting École Polytechnique would join the Ponts rather than the Mines, as did scientific luminaries such as Augustin-Louis Cauchy, Gustave Coriolis, Augustin Fresnel, and Henri Navier. This changed in the late 1810s, when most of the best-ranked Polytechniciens started opting for the Corps des Mines, a precedence that was fully cemented by the 1850s. Throughout its existence, the Corps des Mines has kept a limited size in line with its elitist character: during the 19th century and until World War II, the yearly intake of new members fluctuated between two and seven, rising to around ten per year in the postwar period and twenty by the late 20th century. The total number of members reached 52 in 1810 and 153 in 1914.

The 1810 decree defined the mission of the Corps des Mines as "to oversee [surveiller] the operation of mines and enterprises". In 1846, in the wake of the Industrial Revolution, an ordinance expanded it to "oversee the condition of fixed [steam] machines and of locomotives", whereas the ingénieurs des Ponts et Chaussées were in charge of the railway tracks. This paved the way for a leading role of the Corps des Mines in the development of rail transport in France. Several members of the Corps des Mines were prominent in the Saint-Simonian movement of the mid-19th century, including Gabriel Lamé, Henri Fournel, Émile Clapeyron, Michel Chevalier, Jean Reynaud, and Louis Le Chatelier.

In the later 19th century, the identity of the Corps des Mines crystallized around the combined legacies of Colbertism, the French Enlightenment, Saint-Simonianism, and an idiosyncratic combination of French liberalism, technocracy and dirigisme. Examples of this synthesis included the history of the Corps written in 1889 by Louis Aguillon and, a bit later, Henry Le Chatelier's influence on a landmark report on French economic development strategy led in 1919 by minister Étienne Clémentel. By that period, the practice of pantouflage, namely mid-career moves from the civil service to executive positions in the business sector, was well established and followed by a majority of members of the Corps des Mines, whereas a stable minority (around a third) kept all their career in government positions. In this context, the Corps's original focus on mining had already been largely diluted by the late 19th century.

=== 20th century ===
In the early 20th century, the scope of activity (and related pantouflage) of the Corps des Mines expanded from its early focus on mining and railways towards steel and metallurgy, utilities, after World War I also oil and chemistry, and from the 1970s, manufacturing and to a lesser extent financial services. From 1915 to 1958, one or two positions per year (nicknamed "mines colos") were reserved for service in the French colonial empire. Members of the Corps des Mines eventually found their ways to senior positions in a diverse array of large companies, albeit typically French rather than foreign-controlled (BP France being an early exception); many of them rose to chief executive of their respective employers. By contrast, few ingénieurs des Mines created their own business, apart from a handful of exceptions including Charles Ledoux (founder in Spain of the Sociedad Minera y Metalúrgica de Peñarroya), Auguste Rateau (founder of an eponymous turbomachinery producer), and Conrad Schlumberger (cofounder of Schlumberger).

During World War II and under the Vichy regime, like other parts of the French civil service, the Corps des Mines largely collaborated with German occupation forces, while a minority of members joined the Resistance. Among the former, Jean Bichelonne became Industry Minister in 1942, led efforts to reorganize France's economy, and was viewed by Albert Speer as a peer; Jean Berthelot was Vichy's minister of transportation, and Robert Gibrat was in charge of food procurement. Conversely, Louis Armand organized the Résistance-Fer network in French railways and was later instrumental in the creation of Euratom, of which he became the first president. Pierre Guillaumat was a member of the Resistance's intelligence service, the Bureau central de renseignements et d'action, and later became Charles de Gaulle's right-hand man for the establishment of France's energy independence. Aimé Lepercq commanded the French Forces of the Interior in the Paris region and was briefly finance minister until his death in a wartime car crash in November 1944.

The Corps des Mines played a central role in the development of France's civil nuclear program, in which Guillaumat was a key figure as were his followers André Giraud and Georges Besse. In 1973, it was granted oversight of France's civil nuclear safety, even though its members were never dominant in the country's nuclear industry. Following the Feyzin disaster of 1966, the Corps des Mines was also increasingly associated with the oversight of dangerous industrial facilities and environmental hazard.

In the last third of the 20th century, the Corps des Mines gradually expanded and diversified its recruitment. In 1970, for the first time, it opened itself to alumni of the École Nationale Supérieure des Mines de Paris, or ingénieurs civils des mines (thus called to differentiate them from the corpsards). In 1974, it did likewise for alumni of the École Normale Supérieure. In 1975 for the first time, a woman became ingénieure des Mines, following the opening in 1972 of École Polytechnique's admission exam to female students. In 1985, the Corps des Mines tightened the conditions for early leave of absence from the civil service, or mise en disponibilité. Around the same time, members of the Corps des Mines increasingly had to compete for senior positions in the corporate world, in contrast with the earlier period when they appeared to have de facto pre-programmed career paths leading to the top, so-called chasses gardées.

=== 21st century ===
In the late 20th and early 21st centuries, the structure of the French state's corps techniques was gradually streamlined. In this process, the Corps des Mines played a consolidating role even though it did not correspondingly expand in size. It absorbed the Corps des Ingénieurs des Instruments de Mesure in 1988, the Corps des Ingénieurs des Télécommunications in 2009, and the Corps de Contrôle des Assurances in 2011. The most consequential of these developments was the 2009 merger with the "Corps des Télécoms", upon which the identity of the Corps des Mines shifted towards greater emphasis on information technology.

== Recruitment and careers ==
Each year, the Corps recruits around 18 members. Of these, 10 are typically alumni from École polytechnique, usually among the top-ranked students, while 2 come from École Normale Supérieure, 2 from Mines Paris and Télécom Paris, and 4 from other backgrounds via professional examinations. As of early 2026, the latter channel included a so-called liste d'aptitude and examen professionnel open to ingénieurs de l'Industrie et des Mines, a civil servants group with overlapping skills but less competitive recruitment than the Corps des Mines; a concours interne open to all other French civil servants; and a concours externe for PhD graduates.

Upon recruitment, members of the Corps des Mines receive a three-year initial training, combining long internships and a dedicated program at Mines Paris, except those who join via professional examinations, who only attend the third year. Most of them then take a role in a regional department of the civil service, or for a minority, a secondment (détachement) to the European Commission. For most of the Corps's existence, such early career positions were in charge of an arrondissement minéralogique within the service des Mines, which had oversight of the mining sector but also of various industrial activities and vehicle inspection (thus the French term plaque minéralogique for a registration plate). These were reorganized repeatedly, becoming in 1992 units of the respective Direction Régionale de l'Industrie, de la Recherche et de l'Environnement (DRIRE), then split in 2009-2010 into Direction Régionale de l'Environnement, de l'Aménagement et du Logement (DREAL) and Direction Régionale des Entreprises, de la Concurrence, de la Consommation, du Travail et de l'Emploi (DIRECCTE), the latter in turn reorganized in 2021 into Direction Régionale de l'Économie, de l'Emploi, du Travail et des Solidarités (DREETS).

The 2009 decree which merged the Corps des Mines with the Corps des Télécoms specified that, within the French public administration, members of the Corps des Mines are expected to contribute to the conception, implementation, and evaluation of public policies in the fields of the industry and economy; energy and natural resources; information and communication technologies; environmental sustainability, industrial safety, and public health; research, innovation, and new technologies; land use planning and transportation; standardization and metrology; and banking, insurance, and financial services. Members often serve in the civil service during their early career, then move to the corporate sector, a practice colloquially referred to as pantouflage. Membership of the Corps des Mines is occasionally viewed as a career accelerant in the context of large French corporations.

== Community ==
As of 2024, 882 members of the Corps des Mines worked in the French civil service. Beyond that formal public identity, the Corps des Mines functions as a wider community in which current and former civil servants often interact, and is identified as such in occasional media commentary. The Mines Paris campus in the center of Paris serves as its central home.

=== Collective representation ===
The Syndicat des Ingénieurs du Corps des Mines (also known as Syndim, est. 1947) is a union that defends the special interests of the members of the Corps within the French civil service.

=== Association amicale ===
The Association Amicale des Ingénieurs des Mines (also known as Amicale du Corps des Mines or ACM, est. 1913) organizes events and debates among the Corps des Mines community.

== Notable Members ==
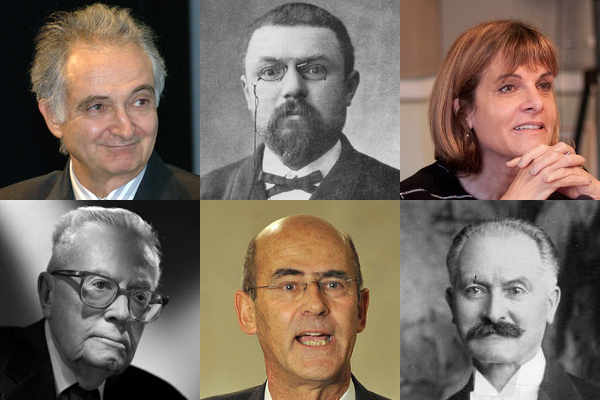
Members of the Corps des mines, from the left to the right and the top to the bottom: Jacques Attali (author, economist), Henri Poincaré (mathematician, physicist), Anne Lauvergeon (business executive), Maurice Allais (Nobel Prize in Economics), Patrick Kron (business executive) and Albert Lebrun (last president of the French Third Republic).

These ingénieurs des mines are listed by chronological order of birthdate. They include twenty members of the French Parliament (lower and upper houses) during the first two centuries of the Corps des Mines.

- André Brochant de Villiers (1772–1840), geologist
- Louis-Étienne Héricart de Thury (1776–1854), public servant and promoter of horticulture
- Eutrope-Barthélemy de Cressac (1777–1844), politician
- Armand Dufrénoy (1792–1857), geologist
- Gabriel Lamé (1795–1870), mathematician
- Élie de Beaumont (1798–1874), geologist
- Émile Clapeyron (1799–1864), physicist, founder of thermodynamics
- Jean-Martial Bineau (1805–1855), statesman and early promoter of railways
- Michel Chevalier (1806–1879), economist and statesman
- Félix Varin d'Ainvelle (1806–1857), politician
- Jean Reynaud (1806–1863), administrator and religious philosopher
- Frédéric le Play (1806–1882), sociologist
- Félix Martha-Beker (1808–1885), historian
- Henri Victor Regnault (1810–1878), chemist and physicist
- François Clément Sauvage (1814–1872), geologist
- Louis Le Chatelier (1815–1873), chemist and industrialist
- Charles-Eugène Delaunay (1816–1872), astronomer and mathematician
- Achille Delesse (1817–1881), geologist
- Ernest Lamé-Fleury (1823–1903), civil servant
- Édouard Sens (1826–1905), politician
- Aimé Blavier (1827–1896), politician
- Charles de Freycinet (1828–1923), statesman
- Camille Jordan (1838–1922), mathematician
- Éloi Béral (1838–1908), civil servant and politician
- Charles Emile Wickersheimer (1848–1915), politician and corporate executive
- Henry Le Chatelier (1850–1936), chemist and academician
- Henry Küss (1852–1914), mining expert
- Henri Poincaré (1854–1912), mathematician and philosopher
- Arthur Fontaine (1860–1931), civil servant and international official
- Léon Janet (1861–1909), politician
- Georges Friedel (1865–1933), mineralogist
- Alfred-Marie Liénard (1869–1958), physicist
- Albert Lebrun (1871–1950), politician
- Conrad Schlumberger (1878–1936), industrialist
- Marcel Ulrich (1880–1933), politician
- Georges Painvin (1886–1980), cryptanalyst
- Paul Lévy (1886–1971), mathematician
- Léon Daum (1887–1966), European official
- Aimé Lepercq (1889–1944), corporate executive and Resistance commander
- Jean Bichelonne (1904–1944), corporate executive and politician
- Louis Armand (1905–1971), corporate executive and statesman
- Pierre Guillaumat (1909–1991), intelligence officer and statesman
- Maurice Allais (1911–2010), economist
- Jacques Friedel (1921–2014), physicist
- Albert Messiah (1921–2013), physicist
- Pierre Laffitte (1925–2021), politician
- André Giraud (1925–1997), administrator and politician
- Raymond Lévy (1927–2018), corporate executive
- Georges Besse (1927–1986), corporate executive
- Robert Dautray (1928–2023), physicist and scientific administrator
- Jacques Lesourne (1928–2020), economist and entrepreneur
- Roger Balian (1933), physicist
- Charles-Michel Marle (1934), mathematician
- Claude Riveline (1936–2024), management theorist
- Lionel Stoléru (1937–2016), economist, politician and conductor
- Francis Mer (1939–2023), corporate executive and politician
- Jean-Pierre Dupuy (1941), philosopher
- Jean-Louis Beffa (1941), corporate executive
- Didier Lombard (1942), corporate executive
- Bertrand P. Collomb (1942–2019), corporate executive
- Thierry de Montbrial (1943), international relations expert
- Jacques Attali (1943), author and consultant
- Jacques Vernier (1944), politician
- Thierry Desmarest (1945–2024), corporate executive
- Noël Forgeard (1946), corporate executive
- Jean-Martin Folz (1947), corporate executive
- Jean-Louis Masson (1947), politician
- Gérard Berry (1948), computer scientist
- Pierre Pringuet (1950), corporate executive
- Patrick Kron (1953), corporate executive
- François Loos (1953), politician
- Jacques Aschenbroich (1954), corporate executive
- Jean-Bernard Lévy (1955), corporate executive
- Jean-Pierre Clamadieu (1958), corporate executive
- Hervé Mariton (1958), politician
- Anne Lauvergeon (1959), corporate executive
- Jean-Laurent Bonnafé (1961), corporate executive
- Fabrice Brégier (1961), corporate executive
- Patrick Pouyanné (1963), corporate executive
- Laure de La Raudière (1965), politician
- Isabelle Kocher (1966), corporate executive
- Nicolas Mayer-Rossignol (1977), politician
- Emmanuel Farhi (1978–2020), economist
