= Achille Delesse =

French geologist and mineralogist

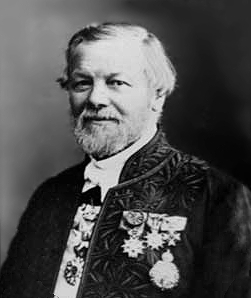
Achille Delesse

Achille Ernest Oscar Joseph Delesse (3 February 1817 – 24 March 1881) was a French geologist and mineralogist. He is credited for inventing the Delesse principle in stereology.

== Education and career ==
Delesse was born at Metz. At the age of twenty he entered the École polytechnique, and subsequently went to the Ecole des Mines, where he was trained under the tutelage of Jean-Baptiste Élie de Beaumont and Ours-Pierre-Armand Petit-Dufrénoy. In 1845, he was appointed to the chair of mineralogy and geology at the University of Franche-Comté in Besançon. In 1850, he became the chair of geology at the Sorbonne in Paris; and in 1864, professor of agriculture at the Ecole des Mines.

Delesse died in Paris on 24 March 1881.

== Research ==
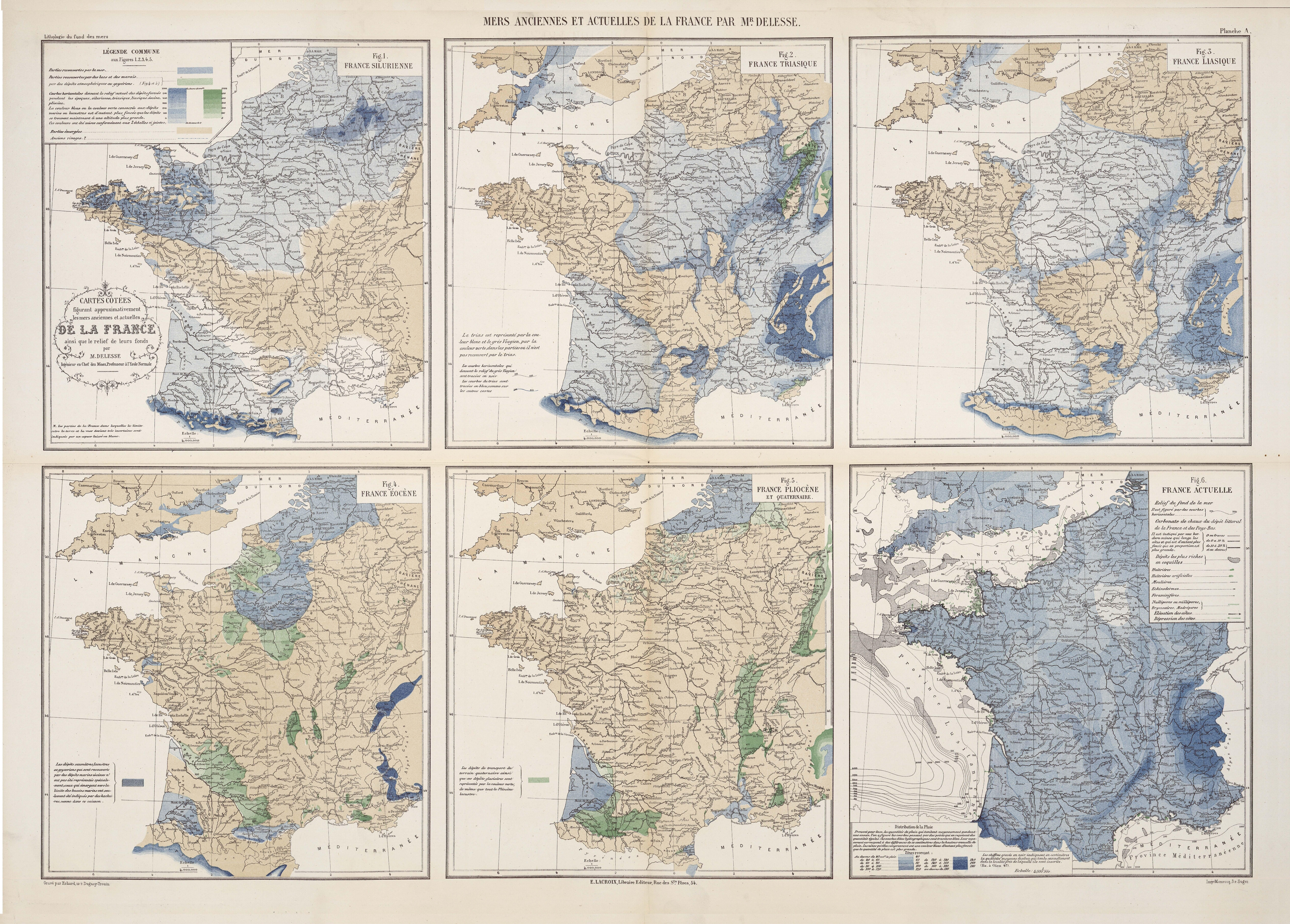
Lithologie des mers de France et des mers principales du globe (1871)

In early years as ingénieur des mines, Delesse investigated and described various new minerals; he proceeded afterward to the study of rocks, devising new methods for their determination, and giving particular descriptions of melaphyre, arkose, porphyry, syenite, and others. The igneous rocks of the Vosges, and those of the Alps, Corsica, etc., and the subject of metamorphism occupied his attention. He also prepared in 1858 geological and hydrological maps of Paris, with reference to the underground water, similar maps of the départements of the Seine and Seine-et-Marne, and an agronomic map of the Seine-et-Marne (1880), in which he showed the relation that exists between the physical and chemical characters of the soil and the geological structure.

The annual Revue des progrès de géologie of Delesse, undertaken with the assistance (1860–1865) of Auguste Laugel and afterwards (1865–1878) of Albert de Lapparent, was carried on from 1860 to 1880. His observations on the lithology of the deposits accumulated beneath the sea were of special interest and importance. His separate publications were: Recherches sur l'origine des roches (Paris, 1865); Étude sur le métamorphisme des roches (1869), Lithologie des mers de France et des mers principales du globe (2 vols. and atlas, 1871).

== Honors ==
Delesse was elected as a member to the American Philosophical Society in 1863, and to the French Academy of Sciences in 1879. In 1878, he became inspector-general of the Corps des mines.
