= Proportionator =

The proportionator is the most efficient unbiased stereological method used to estimate population size in samples.

A typical application is counting the number of cells in an organ. The proportionator is related to the optical fractionator and physical dissector methods that also estimate population. The optical and physical fractionators use a sampling method called systematic uniform random sampling, or SURS. Unlike these two methods the proportionator introduces sampling with probability proportional to size, or PPS. With SURS all sampling sites are equal. With PPS sites are not sampled with the same probability. The reason for using PPS is to improve the efficiency of the estimation process.

Efficiency is the notion of how much is gained by a given amount of work. A more efficient method provides better results for the same amount of work. The proportionator provides a better estimate, that is a more precise estimate, than either of these two methods: the optical fractionator and physical dissector . The PPS is implemented by assigning a value to a sampling site. This value is the characteristic of the sampling site. The proportionator becomes the optical fractionator if the characteristic is constant, i.e. the same, for all sampling sites. If there is no difference between sampling sites, then the proportionator behaves the same as the optical fractionator. In actual sampling, the characteristic varies across the tissue being studied. Information about the distribution of the characteristic is used to refine the sampling. The greater the variance of the characteristic, the greater the efficiency of the proportionator. What this means to the stereologist is simple: if you need to count more and more to get the CE needed to publish just stop and switch to the proportionator.

The proportionator is a patented process that is not generally available. The only current licensee for the patent is Visiopharm.

== Introduction ==
The proportionator is the de facto standard method used to count cells in large projects. The increased efficiency provided by the proportionator makes more work intensive methods such as the optical fractionator less attractive except in small projects.

A common misconception in the stereological literature is that design based methodologies require that all objects of interest must have the same probability of being selected. It is true that making such a design decision ensures an unbiased result, but it is not necessary. The use of nonuniform sampling is often used in stereological work. The point sampled intercept method selects cells using a point probe. The result is a volume-weighted estimate of the size of the cells. This is not a biased result.

A sampling method known as probability proportional to size, or PPS, selects objects based on a characteristic that differs between objects. An excellent example of this is the selection of trees based on their diameter, or selecting a cell based on volume. The PSI selects cells with points. DeVries estimators select trees with lines. Sections select objects based on their height. These are examples of objects being selected in a varying probability by probes. In these examples the characteristic is a function of the objects themselves. That does not have to be the case.

The proportionator applies PPS to counting cells. The PPS is employed to gain efficiency in the sampling, and not to produce a weighted estimate, such as a volume weighted estimate. The optical fractionator is the older standard for estimating the number of cells in an unbiased manner. The optical fractionator, and other sampling methods, has some statistical uncertainty. This uncertainty is due to the variance of the sampling even though the result is unbiased. The efficiency of the sampling can be determined by use of the coefficient of error, or CE. This value describes the variance of the sampling method. Often, biological sampling is done at a CE of .05.

The efficiency of a sampling method is the amount of work it takes to obtain a desired CE. A more efficient method is one that requires less work to obtain a desired CE. A method is less efficient if the same amount of work results in a larger CE.

Suppose that every sample always gave the same result. There would be no difference between samples. This means that the variance in this case is 0. No more than 1 sample would be required to obtain a good result. (Understand that this might not be efficient if the sampling requires a great deal of work and there is no need for a CE this low.) If samples differ, then the variance is positive, and so is the CE.

The typical method of controlling the CE is to do more counting. The literature on the optical fractionator recommends methods of deciding where to increase the workload: more slices, or more optical dissectors. In keeping with this notion some amount of effort has been made to perform automatic image acquisition and counting to facilitate the process. The proportionator provides a superior result by avoiding more counting.

== Plotless sampling ==
One of the earliest stereological methods that employed PPS was introduced by Walter Bitterlich in 1939 to improve the efficiency of fieldwork in the forest sciences. Bitterlich developed a sampling method that revolutionized the forest sciences. Up to this time the sampling quadrat method proposed by Pond and Clements in 1898 was still in use. Laying out sampling quadrats at each sampling site was a difficult process at times due to the physical obstructions of the natural world. Besides the physical issues it was also a costly procedure. It took a considerable amount of time to lay out a rectangle and to measure the trees included in the quadrat. Bitterlich realized that PPS could be used in the field. Bitterlich proposed the use of a sampling angle. All of the trees selected by a fixed angle from a sampling point would be counted. The quadrat, or plot as it was often called, was not required.

The quantity being estimated by the researchers was tree volume. The original sampling method was to choose a number of sampling points. The researcher traveled to each sampling point. A quadrat, rectangular sampling area, was laid out at each sampling point. Measurements of the trees in the quadrats was used to estimate tree volume. A typical measurement is basal area.

Bitterlich's method was to choose a number of sampling points. The researcher traveled to each sampling point just as in the quadrat method. At each sampling point the researcher used an angle gauge to see if a tree had a larger apparent angle than the gauge. If so, the tree was counted. No quadrat and no measurements! Just count and go. The result of this procedure was an estimate of tree volume.

Lou Grosenbaugh realized the importance of Bitterlich's work and wrote a number of articles describing the method. Soon a host of devices from angle gauge, to relascope, to sampling prism were developed. The Bitterlich method, employing PPS, and these devices profoundly increased the efficiency of fieldwork.

The proportionator reduces the workload by avoiding the expense of increased counting. The efficiency increase is attained by employing PPS. Efforts to automate the counting process attack the variance problem at the wrong level of sampling. The better solution is to reduce the workload before going to the counting step. The optimal situation is to have all samples providing identical counts. The next best situation is to reduce the difference between samples.

The proportionator adjusts the sampling scheme to select samples that are likely to provide estimates that have a smaller difference. Thus the variance of the estimator is addressed without changing the workload. That results in a gain in efficiency due to the reduction in variance for a given cost.

The main steps in sampling biological tissue are:

1. Selection of a set of animals
2. Selection of tissue, usually organs from the animals in step 1
3. Sampling of the organs by means such as slabbing, cutting bars from organs in step 2
4. Selecting a sample of the slices produced from the material in step 3
5. Selection of sampling sites on slices from step 4
6. Sampling in an optical dissector within the sampling sites chosen in step 5

The typical attempt at increasing efficiency is the counting which occurs in step 6. The proportionator adjusts the sampling at step 5. This is accomplished by assigning a characteristic to each sampling site. Since each of the sampling sites is viewed it is possible for the automated systems to make a visual record of the site. The image collected at each site is used to determine a value for the site. The values for the sites are the characteristic. Recall that the characteristic may be, but does not have to be, a function of the objects being counted. The potential sampling sites are then sampled based on the observed characteristic. Sites are chosen in a non-uniform manner, but still an unbiased method. Not only is the result unbiased, but the result is not weighted by the characteristic. The end result is that the difference between samples is reduced. This reduces the variance. Therefore, the workload is reduced.

Experimental evidence demonstrates that the proportionator significantly reduces the variance between samples, especially in situations where the tissue distribution is heterogeneous. This means that the situations where it is harder to reduce the variance, or improve the CE, are just the situations where the proportionator excels. Another way to look at this is that the proportionator is designed to take the CE reduction issue out of the hands of the researcher.

Suppose that the goal is to have a CE of .05. If the CE is larger than that value, then the only option available in the optical fractionator method is to increase the counting by either using more slices or more sampling sites on the slices. The proportionator is able to adjust the sampling to decrease the CE without increasing the counting. In fact, if the proportionator is able to reduce the CE below .05, then it is possible to reduce the counting workload and allow the CE to come up to the .05 requirement.

PPS revolutionized the forestry sciences. The application of PPS to cell counting makes larger scale research projects possible, while saving time and reducing expenses.

== Sources ==
- Gardi, J.E., J. R. Nyengard, H.J.G. Gundersen, Using unbiased image analysis for improving unbiased stereological number estimates - a pilot simulation study using the smooth fractionator, Journal of Microscopy, 2006, Vol. 222, Pt. 3, pp. 242–250
- Gardi, J.E., J.R. Nyengard, H.J.G. Gundersen, Automatic sampling for unbiased and efficient stereological estimation using the proportionator in biological studies, Journal of Microscopy, 2008, Vol. 230, Pt. 1, pp. 108–120
- Grosenbaugh, L.R., Plotless Timber Estimates - New, Fast, Easy, Journal of Forestry, 1952, Vol. 52, pp. 32–37
- Grosenbaugh, L.R., The Gains from Sample-Tree Selection with Unequal Probabilities, Journal of Forestry, 1967, Vol. 65, No. 3, pp. 203–206
- Keller, K.K., Andersen, I.T., Andersen, J.B., Hahn, U., Stengaard-Pedersen, K., Hauge, E.M., Nyengaard, J.R., Improving efficiency in stereology: a study applying the proportionator and the autodisector on virtual slides, Journal of Microscopy, 2013

=== Commercial products ===
- newCast by Visiopharm
