= Eva Vedel Jensen =

Danish mathematician

Eva Bjørn Vedel Jensen (born 14 June 1951) is a Danish mathematician and statistician known for her work in spatial statistics, stereology, stochastic geometry, and medical imaging. She is a professor emeritus in the Department of Mathematical Sciences at Aarhus University.

== Education and career ==
After earning a master's degree at Aarhus University in 1976, she became a faculty member at the university in 1979. She completed a doctorate at Aarhus in 1987, and became full professor there in 2003.

== Recognition ==
Vedel Jensen has been an Elected Member of the International Statistical Institute since 1992, and is also a member of the Royal Danish Academy of Sciences and Letters.

She won the Villum Kann Rasmussen Annual Award for Technical and Scientific Research of the Villum Foundation in 2009. She was named a knight of the Order of the Dannebrog in 2010. The University of Bern gave her an honorary doctorate in 2013.

== Selected publications ==
Vedel Jensen is the author of books including:

- Local Stereology (World Scientific, 1998)
- Stereology for Statisticians (with Adrian Baddeley, Chapman & Hall/CRC, 2005)

She has also written several highly cited papers with Hans Jørgen G. Gundersen including:

- Jensen, E. B.; Gundersen, H. J. G.; Østerby, R. (January 1979), "Determination of membrane thickness distribution from orthogonal intercepts", Journal of Microscopy, 115 (1): 19–33, doi:10.1111/j.1365-2818.1979.tb00149.x, PMID 423237, S2CID 24466831
- Gundersen, H. J. G.; Jensen, E. B. (May 1985), "Stereological estimation of the volume-weighted mean volume of arbitrary particles observed on random sections", Journal of Microscopy, 138 (2): 127–142, Bibcode:1985JMic..138..127G, doi:10.1111/j.1365-2818.1985.tb02607.x, PMID 4020857, S2CID 40399794
- Gundersen, H. J. G.; Jensen, E. B. (September 1987), "The efficiency of systematic sampling in stereology and its prediction", Journal of Microscopy, 147 (3): 229–263, doi:10.1111/j.1365-2818.1987.tb02837.x, PMID 3430576, S2CID 29713041
- Vedel Jensen, E. B.; Gundersen, H. J. G. (April 1993), "The rotator", Journal of Microscopy, 170 (1): 35–44, doi:10.1111/j.1365-2818.1993.tb03321.x, S2CID 221874026
- Gundersen, H. J. G.; Jensen, E. B. V.; Kieu, K.; Nielsen, J. (March 1999), "The efficiency of systematic sampling in stereology – reconsidered", Journal of Microscopy, 193 (3): 199–211, Bibcode:1999JMic..193..199G, doi:10.1046/j.1365-2818.1999.00457.x, PMID 10348656, S2CID 35784656
