= Wickersheimer =

Wickersheimer is a toponymic surname with origins in Wickersheim-Wilshausen. Notable persons with the surname include:

- Charles Emile Wickersheimer (1849–1915), French mining engineer
- Ernest_Wickersheimer (1880–1965), French medical historian
