= Stereology =

Stereology is a branch of applied mathematics that is the three-dimensional interpretation of two-dimensional cross sections of materials or tissues. It provides practical techniques for extracting quantitative information about a three-dimensional material from measurements made on two-dimensional planar sections of the material. Stereology is a method that utilizes random, systematic sampling to provide unbiased and quantitative data. It is an important and efficient tool in many applications of microscopy (such as petrography, materials science, and biosciences including histology, bone and neuroanatomy). Stereology is a developing science with many important innovations being developed mainly in Europe. New innovations such as the proportionator continue to make important improvements in the efficiency of stereological procedures.

In addition to two-dimensional plane sections, stereology also applies to three-dimensional slabs (e.g. 3D microscope images), one-dimensional probes (e.g. needle biopsy), projected images, and other kinds of 'sampling'. It is especially useful when the sample has a lower spatial dimension than the original material. Hence, stereology is often defined as the science of estimating higher-dimensional information from lower-dimensional samples.

Stereology is based on fundamental principles of geometry (e.g. Cavalieri's principle) and statistics (mainly survey sampling inference). It is a completely different approach from computed tomography.

== Classical examples ==
Classical applications of stereology include:

- calculating the volume fraction of quartz in a rock by measuring the area fraction of quartz on a typical polished plane section of rock ("Delesse principle" from Achille Delesse);
- calculating the surface area of pores per unit volume in a ceramic, by measuring the length of profiles of pore boundary per unit area on a typical plane section of the ceramic (multiplied by $4/\pi$);
- calculating the total length of capillaries per unit volume of a biological tissue, by counting the number of profiles of capillaries per unit area on a typical histological section of the tissue (multiplied by 2).
- Find the parameters such as Bone Volume, Trabecular thickness and trabecular number in a given sample of bone.

The popular science fact that the human lungs have a surface area (of gas exchange surface) equivalent to a tennis court (75 square meters), was obtained by stereological methods. Similarly for statements about the total length of nerve fibres, capillaries etc. in the human body.

== Errors in spatial interpretation ==
The word Stereology was coined in 1961 and defined as `the spatial interpretation of sections'. This reflects the founders' idea that stereology also offers insights and rules for the qualitative interpretation of sections.

Stereologists have helped to detect many fundamental scientific errors arising from the misinterpretation of plane sections. Such errors are surprisingly common. For example:

- plane sections of quenched steel contain thin linear streaks of Martensite. For many years this was interpreted as demonstrating that the Martensite inclusions are "needle-like". But if every plane section shows linear profiles, then the Martensite inclusions must be plate-like, rather than needle-like. (Length on sections is related to area in 3D).
- the internal structure of mammalian liver was misunderstood for 100 years (1848–1948) because of a similar error.
- a biological tissue containing capillaries is sectioned. Researchers count the number of profiles of capillaries that are visible in a microscope field, and report the "number of capillaries" or "number of capillaries per unit area". This is an error because the number of capillary profiles on a plane section is related to the length of capillaries, not to their number (which may not even be well-defined). (Number in 2D is related to length in 3D).
- researchers compare plane sections of normal and diseased tissue from an organ. They find that a certain type of cell is seen more frequently in the diseased tissue. They conclude that the disease involves proliferation of these cells. However, the number of cell profiles seen on a section depends both on the number of cells and on their sizes. So it is possible that the disease process simply involves an increase in the size of cells, without any proliferation. (Number in 2D is related to length or height in 3D).
- the construction of historic Tabby buildings in the Carolinas was assumed to be done with sand obtained from sand pits. Stereological studies demonstrated that the sand was obtained from dunes facing the bays. This has caused the method of construction to be rethought as well as methods of restoration.

== Stereology is not tomography ==
Stereology is a completely different enterprise from computed tomography. A computed tomography algorithm effectively reconstructs the complete internal three-dimensional geometry of an object, given a complete set of all plane sections through it (or equivalent X-ray data). On the contrary, stereological techniques require only a few 'representative' plane sections, from which they statistically extrapolate the three-dimensional material.

Stereology exploits the fact that some 3-D quantities can be determined without 3-D reconstruction: for example, the 3-D volume of any object can be determined from the 2-D areas of its plane sections, without reconstructing the object. (This means that stereology only works for certain quantities like volume, and not for other quantities).

== Sampling principles ==
In addition to using geometrical facts, stereology applies statistical principles to extrapolate three-dimensional shapes from plane section(s) of a material. The statistical principles are the same as those of survey sampling (used to draw inferences about a human population from an opinion poll, etc.). Statisticians regard stereology as a form of sampling theory for spatial populations.

To extrapolate from a few plane sections to the three-dimensional material, essentially the sections must be 'typical' or 'representative' of the entire material. There are basically two ways to ensure this:

- It is assumed that any plane section is typical (e.g. assume that the material is completely homogeneous);

or

- Plane sections are selected at random, according to a specified random sampling protocol

The first approach is the one that was used in classical stereology. Extrapolation from the sample to the 3-D material depends on the assumption that the material is homogeneous. This effectively postulates a statistical model of the material. This method of sampling is referred to as model-based sampling inference.

The second approach is the one typically used in modern stereology. Instead of relying on model assumptions about the three-dimensional material, we take our sample of plane sections by following a randomized sampling design, for example, choosing a random position at which to start cutting the material. Extrapolation from the sample to the 3-D material is valid because of the randomness of the sampling design, so this is called design-based sampling inference.

Design-based stereological methods can be applied to materials which are inhomogeneous or cannot be assumed to be homogeneous. These methods have gained increasing popularity in the biomedical sciences, especially in lung-, kidney-, bone-, cancer- and neuro-science. Many of these applications are directed toward determining the number of elements in a particular structure, e.g. the total number of neurons in the brain.

== Geometrical models ==
Many classical stereological techniques, in addition to assuming homogeneity, also involved mathematical modeling of the geometry of the structures under investigation. These methods are still popular in materials science, metallurgy and petrology where shapes of e.g. crystals may be modelled as simple geometrical objects. Such geometrical models make it possible to extract additional information (including numbers of crystals). However, they are extremely sensitive to departures from the assumptions.

== Total quantities ==
In the classical examples listed above, the target quantities were relative densities: volume fraction, surface area per unit volume, and length per unit volume. Often we are more interested in total quantities such as the total surface area of the lung's gas exchange surface, or the total length of capillaries in the brain. relative densities are also problematic because, unless the material is homogeneous, they depend on the unambiguous definition of the reference volume.

Sampling principles also make it possible to estimate total quantities such as the total surface area of lung. Using techniques such as systematic sampling and cluster sampling we can effectively sample a fixed fraction of the entire material (without the need to delineate a reference volume). This allows us to extrapolate from the sample to the entire material, to obtain estimates of total quantities such as the absolute surface area of lung and the absolute number of cells in the brain.

== Timeline ==
- 1733 G. Buffon discovers connections between geometry and probability, that ultimately lay the foundations for stereology.
- 1843 Mining geologist A. E. Delesse invents the first technique (Delesse's principle) for determining volume fraction in 3D from area fraction on sections.
- 1885 mathematician Morgan Crofton publishes theory of `geometrical probability' including stereological methods.
- 1895 first known description of a correct method for counting cells in microscopy.
- 1898 geologist A. Rosiwal explains how to determine volume fraction from length fraction on linear transects.
- 1916 S. J. Shand builds the first integrating linear accumulator to automate stereological work.
- 1919 committee of ASTM (American Society for Testing and Materials) established to standardise measurement of grain size.
- 1923 statistician S.D. Wicksell formulates the general problem of particle size – inferring the distribution of sizes of 3-D particles from the observed distribution of sizes of their 2-D profiles – and solves it for spherical particles.
- 1929 mathematician H. Steinhaus develops stereological principles for measuring length of curves in 2D.
- 1930 geologist A.A. Glagolev builds a device for point counting with a microscope.
- 1940s cancer researcher H. Chalkley publishes methods for determining surface area from plane sections.
- 1944 mathematician P. A. P. Moran describes a method for measuring the surface area of a convex object from the area of projected images.
- 1946 anatomist Abercrombie shows that many current methods for counting cells are erroneous, and proposes a correct method.
- 1946–58 materials scientist S.A. Saltykov publishes methods for determining surface area and length from plane sections.
- 1948 biologist H. Elias uncovers a one-hundred-year-old misunderstanding of the structure of mammalian liver.
- 1952 Tomkeieff and Campbell calculate the internal surface area of a human lung.
- 1961 word 'stereology' coined. Foundation of the International Society of Stereology
- 1961 materials scientists Rhines and De Hoff develop a method for estimating the number of objects e.g. grains, particles, cells of convex shape.
- 1966 Weibel and Elias calculate the efficiency of stereological sampling techniques.
- 1972 E. Underwood describes stereological techniques for projected images.
- 1975–80 statisticians R.E. Miles and P.J. Davy show that stereology can be formulated as a survey sampling technique, and develop design-based methods.
- 1983 R.E Miles and (independently) E.B. Jensen and H.J.G. Gundersen develop point-sampled intercept methods for inferring the mean volume of arbitrarily-shaped particles from plane sections.
- 1984 D.C Sterio describes the 'disector' counting method.
- 1985 stereologist H. Haug criticises the dogma that the normal human brain progressively loses neurons with age. He shows that the existing evidence is invalid.
- 1985 statistician A. Baddeley introduces the method of vertical sections.
- 1986 Gundersen proposes the 'fractionator' sampling technique.
- 1988–92 Gundersen and Jensen propose the 'nucleator' and 'rotator' techniques for estimating particle volume.
- 1998 Kubinova introduces the first virtual probe that estimates surface area in preferential slices.
- 1999 Larsen and Gundersen introduce global spatial sampling for estimation of total length in preferential slices.
- 2002 Mouton, Gokhale, Ward and West introduce virtual probe "space balls" for estimation of total length.
- 2004 Gokhale, Evans, Mackes and Mouton introduce virtual probe "virtual cycloids" for estimation of total surface area.
- 2008 Gundersen, Gardi, Nyengaard introduce the proportionator method.

The primary scientific journals for stereology are Image Analysis & Stereology (former Acta Stereologica) and Journal of Microscopy

== See also ==
- Merz grid
