= Pantouflage =

French practice

The term pantouflage refers to a practice by which high-level French civil servants, usually former students of the École Polytechnique or the École nationale d'administration, obtain work in private enterprise. In use, the term can be applied to all civil servants, not just those who attain notoriety. In American contexts, this concept is known by economists as a revolving door. The practice is often viewed negatively by the public.

== Origin ==
Early on, in slang usage at the École Polytechnique, the word "pantoufle" (French for slipper) referred to the act of avoiding public service after study. Those who "trained in the pantoufle," the "pantouflards," carried the title of "former student of the École Polytechnique," and gave up the right to the "Diploma of the École Polytechnique". Later, the term also came to refer to the repayment of education costs by individuals who had failed to serve ten years in civil service after obtaining their degree (this is comparable to the practice of "dedit-formation" in France, in which employers might be eligible for reimbursement of expenses by employees who resign prematurely).

As frequently as civil servants leave public work and acquire the "pantoufle," private enterprises recruit students at the conclusion of their studies.

The term "pantouflage" also applies to politicians who, following an electoral loss or a termination from a ministerial position, assume a private industry, high-paying position without significant responsibilities. This is often undertaken during an interim period when formerly elected politicians vet new opportunities to assume elected office. French popular phrasing describes this scenario as "Emploi fictif," or fake employment.

== Figures ==
Between 1985 and 1990, the Conseil d'État experienced at least four resignations per year. In 1993, the diplomatic corps lost some twenty of its members. The 1992 directory of the corps préfectoral lists some one hundred members in the private sector or in semi-public employment. In May 1990, the review "ENA-mensuel" estimated that of 4,400 former students of the École nationale d'administration, 737 worked in the private sector. Among these, 6.1% had carried out roles in the Conseil, 8.3% the Court of Audit of France and 18.8% in Financial Oversight. The same year, the Corps of Mines (France) registered 16.8% incidence of pantouflage and in the Corps of Bridges and Roads (France), 14.7% incidence.

== Dissemination of pantouflage ==
The term "pantouflage" carries a particularly pejorative meaning when it is applied to former civil servants who worked in an administration exercising control over private-sector industry.

=== France ===
In France, such movements are supervised under strict legal structures.

Thus, according to article 423-13 of the French criminal code, concerning illegal gains through conflicts of interest:

Punishable by two years imprisonment and/or compensatory fines of up to 30,000 Euros, for a person who is charged as having left civil service or public office to assume a private-sector position in an industry over which they had previously exercised influence as a public servant, including:

- responsibility for oversight over private industry,
- responsibility for approving contracts of any kind with a private business or for vetting such private contracts
- responsibility for proposing and advising on private sector contracts for later decision by controlling public officials, or for taking or receiving advice or capital from a private enterprise

before the passing of three years from the date of conclusion of a civil service role.

The Commission on Ethics for Civil Servants is charged with verifying whether an agent of civil service who assumed a private sector position did so legitimately. Investigations and determinations are undertaken at the request of the manager of the governmental administration from which the individual in question resigned.

=== Italy ===
Pantouflage is regulated by Article 53, paragraph 16-ter introduced in Legislative Decree no. 165/01 (Consolidated Act on Public Employment) by Law no. 190/12, the anti-corruption law (“Provisions for the prevention and punishment of corruption and illegality in the public administration”).

Article 16-ter provides that:

- Employees who, during the last three years of service, have exercised authoritative or negotiating powers on behalf of public authorities pursuant to Article 1, paragraph 2 of Legislative Decree No. 165/01, cannot provide, within three years of their public employment contract being terminated, work or professional services to private parties to whom public authorities have provided services in furtherance of the said powers (1st period);
- Contracts entered into and the tasks conferred in violation of the provisions of this paragraph are invalid and the “private parties who have executed contracts or have been conferred with powers to contract are forbidden from contracting with the public administration for the next three years and are required to return any compensation that they have received and that has been traced back to them” (2nd period).

Paragraph 16-ter must then be read in conjunction with Article 21 of Legislative Decree No. 39 of 8 April 2013 (containing “Provisions detailing appointments that cannot be conferred by public authorities and by publicly controlled private entities and that are to be construed as incompatible”), which states that “for the sole purpose of applying the prohibitions provided for under paragraph 16-ter”, those holding of one of the positions provided for under Legislative Decree No. 39/13 (which also include external parties with whom the authority “the public body or the publicly controlled private law entity” has established a working, employment or free-lance relationship) are also considered to be public employees.

The anti-corruption law is expressly intended to implement (i) Article 6 of the United Nations Convention against Corruption, adopted by the UN General Assembly on October 31, 2003 and ratified under Law no. 116 of 3 August 2009, and (ii) Articles 20 and 21 of the Criminal Convention against Corruption, adopted in Strasbourg on 27 January 1999 and ratified under Law no. 110 of 28 June 2012. It identifies at a national level the Italian Anti-Corruption Authority and the other bodies responsible for carrying out control, prevention and punishment activities against corruption and illegality in the public administration in such a way as to ensure a coordinated action.

=== Japan ===
The phenomenon of pantouflage exists in Japan where it is termed amakudari, literally, "descent from paradise or the sky," in reference to the Japanese mythological shinto descent of gods to earth, and concerns the retirement of civil servants into the private sector. On April 1, 2009, the Aso administration adopted a bill to eliminate this practice by creating a special agency to lure former civil servants back into government employment, as long as former officials do not directly negotiate for higher salaries

In his election bid in 2009, the administration of Yukio Hatoyama, pledged to establish this agency upon his assuming power; this was a direct response to critics who assailed him as an "amakudari," and to reduce administrative inneficiency.

=== Quebec ===
In Quebec, a law on lobbying restricts former executive directors and assistant executive directors of municipalities in their post-electoral careers. They must not have used information obtained in their former public positions to profit in another enterprise. However, no law forbids private enterprises in communities from hiring former public officials.

== See also ==
=== Related articles ===
- Corruption
- Revolving door (politics)
- Amakudari
- Conflict of interest
