= Lewis Grosenbaugh =

Lewis R. Grosenbaugh
- Born: November 4, 1913; East Orange, New Jersey
- Died: April 22, 2003 (aged 89)
- Citizenship: United States
- Education: Dartmouth College, Yale University
- Known for: Advancements in sampling and measurements for forest inventories; Angle gauge sampling; Probability proportional to prediction (3P) sampling;
- Awards: Barrington Moore Award and Fellow, Society of American Foresters; Yale University School of Forestry & Environmental Studies Distinguished Alumnus and Distinguished Service Award
- Scientific career
- Fields: Forestry
- Workplaces: US Forest Service

Lewis R. (Lou) Grosenbaugh (November 4, 1913 – April 22, 2003) was a prominent U.S. Forest Service researcher and head of the Forest Service's first Pioneering Research Unit, in forest mensuration, in Berkeley, California. Known for his contributions to the fields of forest inventory, forest measurement, and forest management, Grosenbaugh built on Walter Bitterlich's idea of estimating the density of a forest with timber cruising so that individual trees could be used to estimate various stand measures, such as volume per acre.

== Career ==
- 1936. U.S. Forest Service Junior Forester on the Ouachita National Forest
- 1938 timber management assistant and assistant forester, Ozark National Forest
- 1941 U.S. Naval Reserve, highest rank Lieutenant Commander
- 1946 Associate Forester, National Forests in Florida
- 1946 Silviculturist, Southern Forest Experiment Station, New Orleans
- 1951 Division Chief of Forest Management Research, Forest Genetics Research, Forest Fire Research, Forest Pathology Research and Watershed Management Research
- 1960 Research Forester and head, Pioneering Research Unit—Mensuration, Berkeley, California
- 1968 head, Pioneering Research Unit—Mensuration, Atlanta, Georgia
- 1974 Retired, U.S. Forest Service
- 1977 Adjunct Professor, University of Florida School of Forest Resources and Conservation

== Legacy ==
A notable contribution of Grosenbaugh was adapting Bitterlich's techniques to forest inventories throughout the US. Grosenbaugh promoted the findings of European foresters and brought them the researchers and foresters in the US.

Grosenbaugh had pioneered many original thoughts during his work in statistical sampling of trees in forests, including subsampling trees to obtain a volume to basal area ratio.
