= Claude Riveline =

French economist and academic (1936–2024)

- Born: 16 September 1936; Paris, France
- Died: 9 December 2024 (aged 88)
- Education: École polytechnique Mines Paris – PSL
- Occupations: Economist, academic

Claude Riveline (16 September 1936 – 9 December 2024) was a French economist and academic.

== Life and career ==
Born in Paris on 16 September 1936, Riveline graduated from the École polytechnique in 1956 and from the Mines Paris – PSL in 1961. He taught at the latter for his entire career, leading courses in organizational management to the Corps des mines.

He was an Officer of the Legion of Honour, Commander of the National Order of Merit, Combatant’s Cross and Commander of the Order of the Academic Palms. He conducted a significant amount of research on economic theory. He believed that the "cost of "goods" was arbitrary, and that the determination of the price of goods was entirely man-made.

Riveline was also involved in the French Jewish intellectual community as an author and participant in multiple conferences. In 1967, he joined the preparatory committee of the Colloque des intellectuels juifs de langue française and joined conferences in which Emmanuel Levinas gave Talmudic lessons.

Riveline died on 9 December 2024, at the age of 88.

== Publications ==
- "L'argent suspect" (1988)
- "L'État en questions" (1989)
- "Le quant-à-soi aujourd'hui" (1991)
- Évaluation des coûts - éléments d'une théorie de la gestion (1995)
- Petit traité pour expliquer le judaïsme aux non-juifs (2000)
- Idées, tome I (2006)
