= Mount Elie de Beaumont =

Mountain in New Zealand

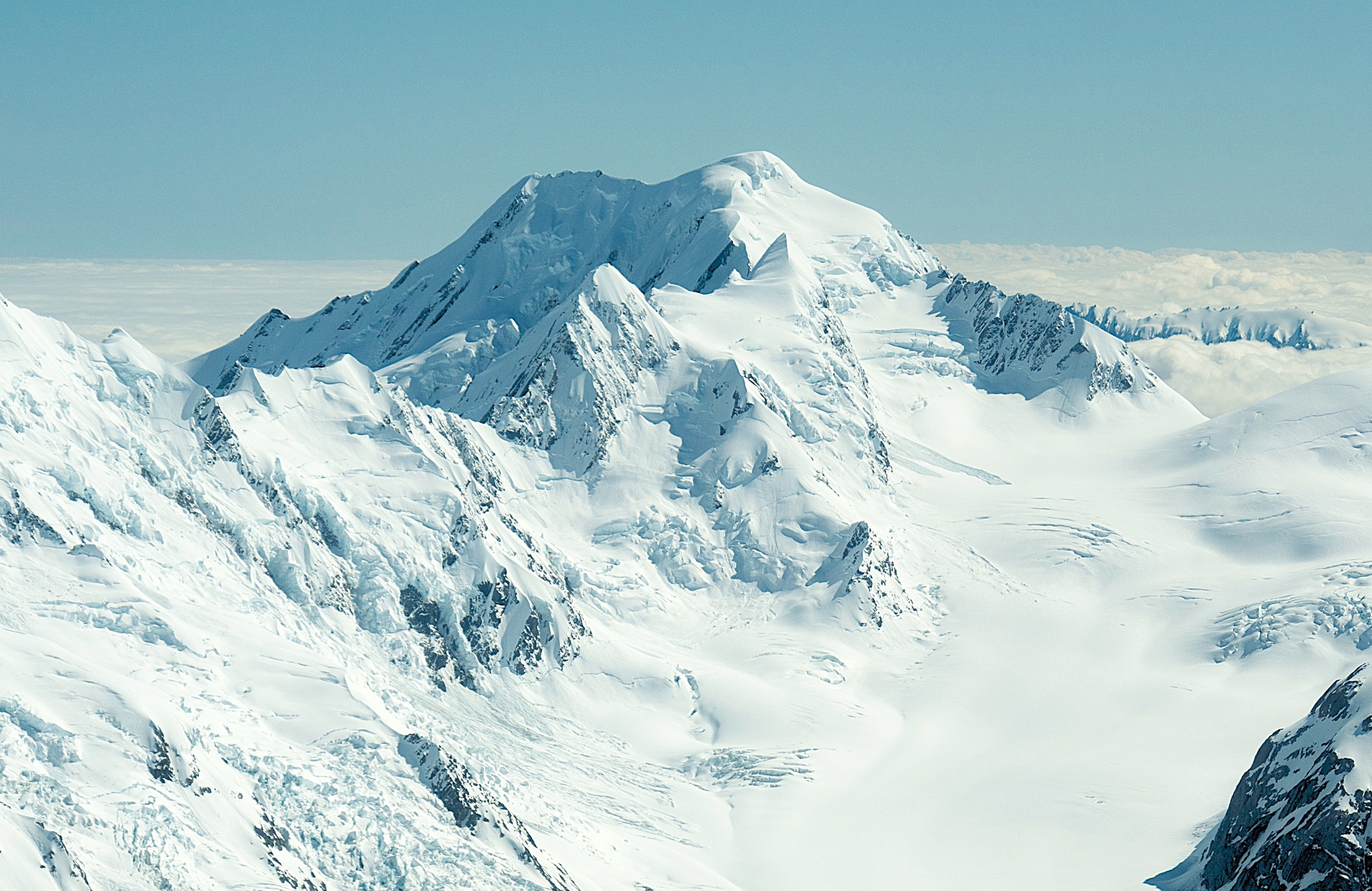
- Aerial view from the south

Highest point
- Elevation: 3,109 m (10,200 ft)
- Listing: New Zealand #5
- Coordinates: 43°28′54″S 170°19′41″E

Geography
- Location within New Zealand
- Location: South Island, New Zealand
- Parent range: Southern Alps

Mount Elie de Beaumont is a 3,109 metres (10,200 ft) high mountain in the Southern Alps on the South Island of New Zealand and the northernmost Three-thousander of the country. It is surrounded by several glaciers like Johannes Glacier in the north, Burton Glacier to the east, Times Glacier to the west and Anna Glacier, a tributary to the Tasman Glacier, in the south. It was named by Julius von Haast after the French geologist Jean-Baptiste Élie de Beaumont.

== Gallery ==
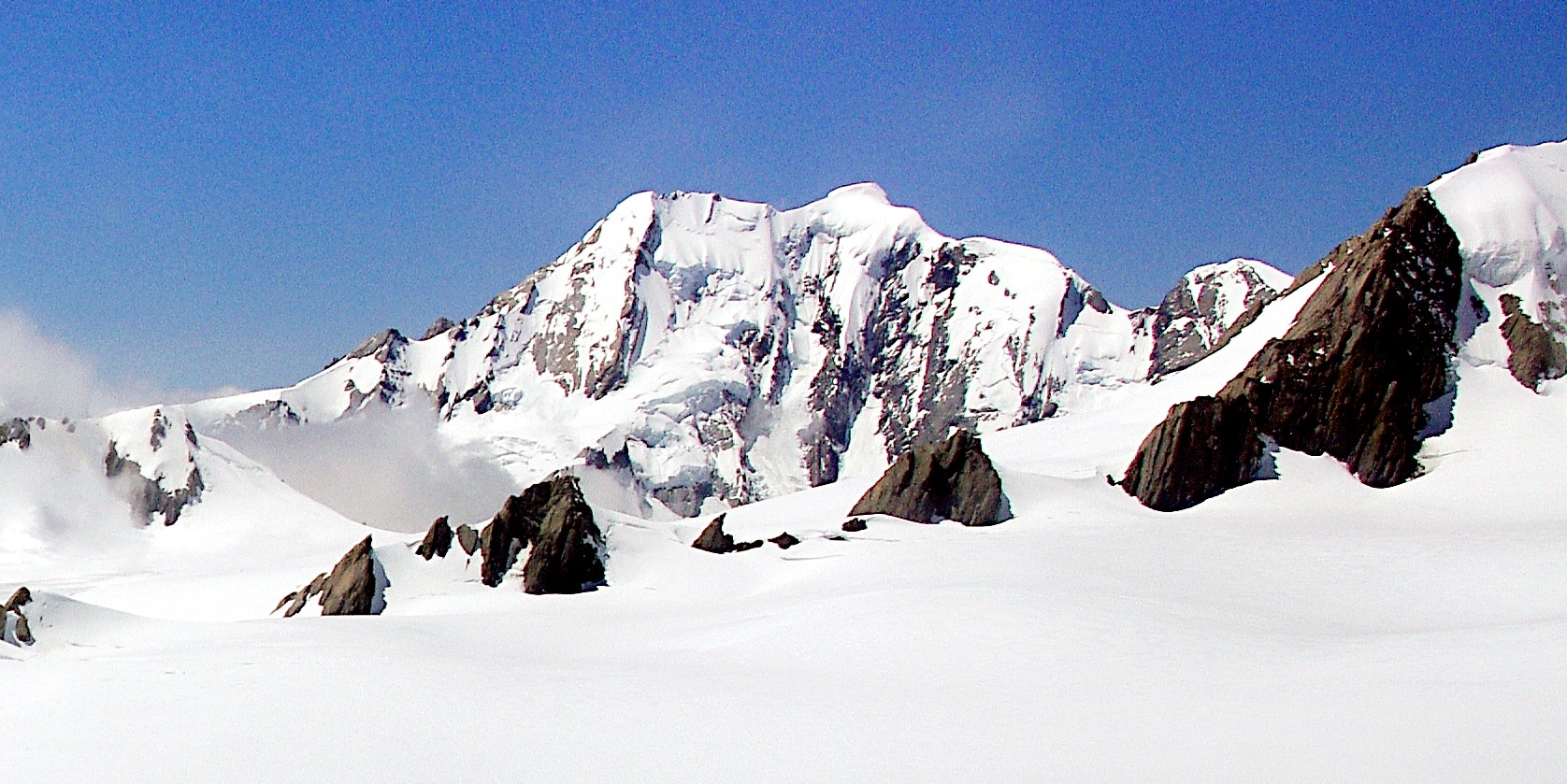
West face of Mount Elie de Beaumont
