= Revolving door (politics) =

Term in politics

In politics, a revolving door denotes a situation where legislators, regulators, or personnel in the public sector move to a similar position in the private sector, where many work in fields related to lobbying. It is analogous to the movement of people in a physical revolving door, hence its name. Critics assert that such a relationship between the government and private sector can lead to conflict of interest and regulatory capture, based on the granting of reciprocated privileges between them.

The term has also been used to refer to the constant switching and ousting of political leaders from office, such as in Australia (which changed its Prime Ministers six times from 2007 to 2018), interwar Yugoslavia, and Japan (which also changed its Prime Ministers six times from 2006 to 2012).

== Overview ==
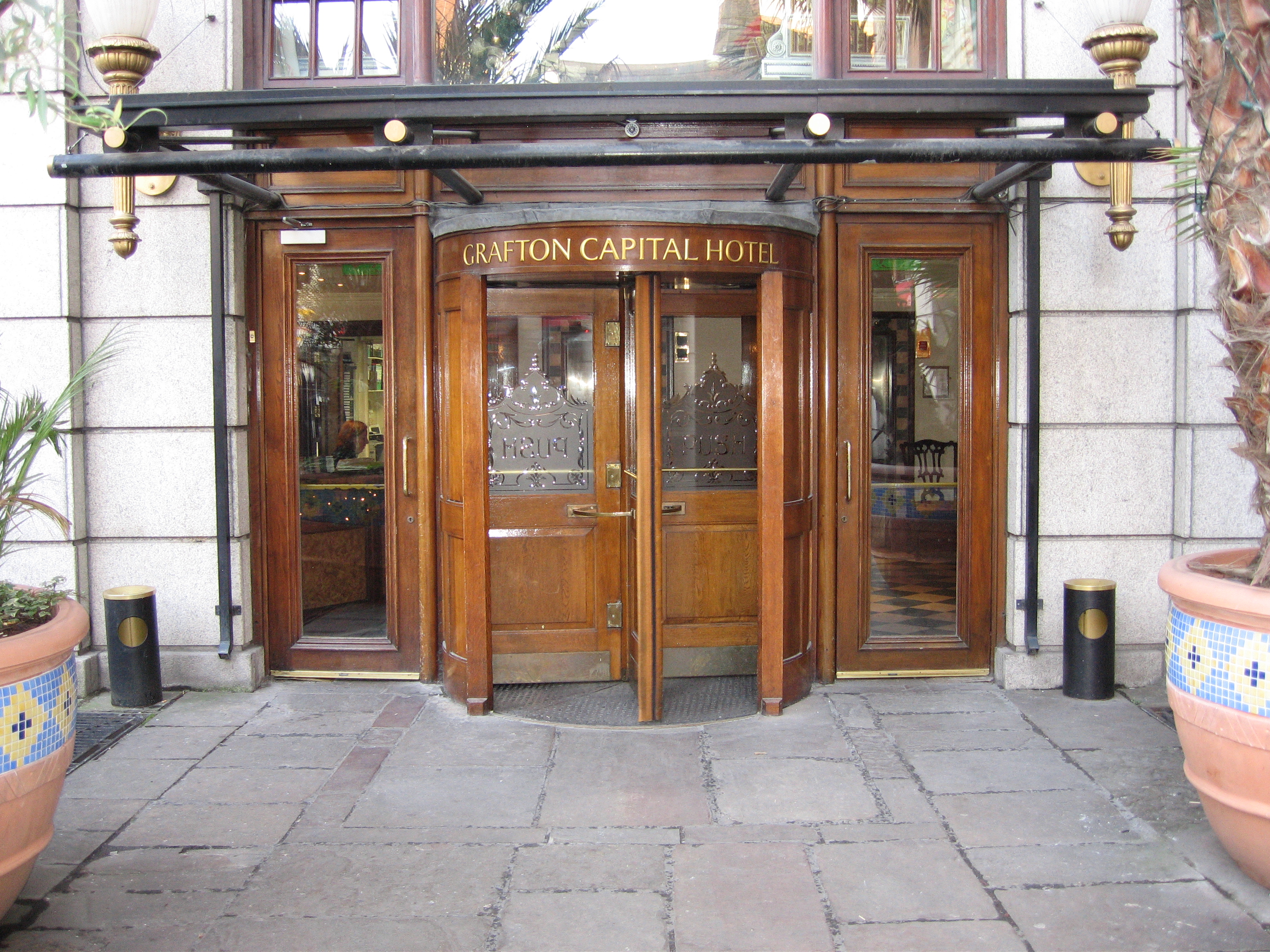
The metaphor of a revolving door has been used to describe people switching jobs, from working as lawmakers to being lobbyists, and vice versa.

=== Previous work ===
The revolving door phenomenon has been a concern at least since the late 1800s, when attempts were made to restrict the movement of individuals between the government and private sector. In the United States, the federal government enacted the first conflict of interest and ethics laws, including imposing cooling-off periods, in the 1950s.

There was renewed public interest in the 2010s with research by Andrew Baker, Simon Johnson and James Kwak, and with the 2008 crisis, when prominent government figures insinuated that previous and future hirings in the financial sphere manipulate the decision-making of eminent government members when it comes to financial matters.

Governments hire industry professionals for their private sector experience, their influence within corporations that the government is attempting to regulate or do business with, and to gain political support (donations and endorsements) from private firms.

Industry, in turn, hires people out of government positions to gain personal access to government officials, seek favorable legislation/regulation and government contracts in exchange for high-paying employment offers, and get inside information on what is going on in government.

In fact, the regulator, while in office, takes actions and makes decisions enabling him to cash in later when joining a firm he has regulated. These actions are termed as bureaucratic capital. It is essentially inside knowledge of the system, including any loopholes that might exist. 'Bureaucratic capital' also consists of a good relationship with the lower-level bureaucracy. 'Bureaucratic capital' therefore enables the bureaucrat to cash in later thereon, after exiting the public sector and joining a firm in the sector he previously regulated. Thus, the bureaucrat can abuse the previous position to increase income in a legal way.

The lobbying industry is especially affected by the revolving door concept, as the main asset for a lobbyist is contacts with and influence on government officials. This industrial climate is attractive for ex-government officials. It can also mean substantial monetary rewards for the lobbying firms and government projects and contracts in the hundreds of millions for those they represent.

A 2023 study of U.S. Department of Health and Human Services appointees showed that 15% had been employed by private health care industries immediately prior to their appointment to government service, and 32% exited the industry at the end of their appointment. Among the health agencies, CDC, CMS, and FDA had the highest rates of industry exit. A 2016 study of 55 FDA reviewers of oncology drugs found that 27% were in biopharmaceutical employment or consulting after leaving the FDA.

A 2014 study of U.S. Department of Defense appointees showed that 28% exited to industry. As of 2023, 80 per cent of U.S. four-star retirees are employed in defense industry.

=== Consequences ===
Scientific papers have demonstrated the consequences of the revolving doors practice and the side effects of those movements are numerous. These can be beneficial either for the companies or for the regulatory bodies.

Authors, such as David Miller and William Dinan, have claimed that there are risks when going in and out of revolving doors. The consequences of this movement can be a conflict of interest or the loss of confidence in the regulating institutions. Another possible side effect of the revolving door practice is that regulators could give away confidential information held by the financial institutions, which would give companies the possibility to get access to information and people involved in the decision-making process of regulating authorities. Revolving doors can also lead to unfair competition advantage as well as an unfair distribution of influencing power. Economic distortion can be explained through the fact that so-called too-big-to-fail firms generate their power in the market through the mechanism of the revolving door and not through salient choices. This is due to the fact that big companies have more money than smaller ones and can thus allow themselves to hire more revolvers.

Another aspect of the revolving door practice is that regulators might be incentivized to push for softer regulation in order to gain access later on in the private sector. Vice versa, regulators can also be influenced to demand stronger stances in policy fields that will benefit the regulator if he aims at a future career in the private sector.

Furthermore, revolving doors make it easier for regulatory agencies to find adequate and qualified workers.

In practice, banks can gain unlawful advantages by legally and illegally manipulating the different stages of policy-making. They can have an impact on the formulation, adoption and implementation of laws, public policies or regulations in different ways:

- Firstly, if (former) Members of Parliament have links to private companies, they can have an influence on the adoption of laws and regulations in their favour. Moreover, they may be reluctant to vote on proposals that would harm corporate interests.
- Secondly, if companies have connections to (former) ministers and their advisors, they may affect the formulation and implementation of policies and regulations in advance or take advantage of non-public information about the regulated industry. This means that the companies can get in advance notice of incoming regulations and that they can be warned of further consequences, negative as well as positive. In most European countries, but also in the US, the use of insider information is punishable by law. In practice, insider trading is most often observed on the stock exchange and also plays a role in revolving doors.

== Jurisdictions ==
Regulation relating to this phenomenon and the related issues of lobbying and the funding of political parties varies considerably around the world. Here are details for a few sample jurisdictions:-

=== Australia ===
In Australia, this is a significant public debate as many state leaders have become private consultants for corporations. There is no legislation against doing so. Post-separation employment is instead governed by the administrative Lobbying Code of Conduct, which bars former ministers and parliamentary secretaries from lobbying on matters they dealt with officially for 18 months after leaving office, and former ministerial advisers, agency heads and senior public servants for 12 months. The Grattan Institute and the Centre for Public Integrity have described the restrictions as weak, noting that they bind only lobbyists listed on the federal register of lobbyists—which covers third-party lobbying firms but not people employed directly by a company as in-house lobbyists—and that the only sanction is removal from the register. The 2018 Grattan Institute study found that about a quarter of federal ministers who left politics after 1990 subsequently took roles with special interests, and that more of them became in-house lobbyists than joined commercial lobbying firms.

In 2015, Port Darwin in Australia's Northern Territory was leased for 99 years to Shandong Landbridge, a Chinese company closely aligned with the Chinese Government's trade policy. The deal was approved by Minister for Trade and Investment Andrew Robb, a member of the governing Liberal Party. In 2016, Robb left politics and accepted a "consultant" position at Shandong Landbridge, with an $880,000 per year salary. In 2019, Robb left the position, shortly before a new "foreign interference" law took effect in Australia.

The airline Qantas, whose commercial position depends on government decisions about international traffic rights, airport slots and foreign ownership limits, has been described in these terms. In October 2024 The Australian Financial Review reported a "revolving door" between the airline's government and media relations teams and the ministerial wing of Parliament House, involving staff from both major parties and moving in both directions. David Epstein, a former chief of staff to prime minister Kevin Rudd and to opposition leader Kim Beazley, was Qantas's group executive for government and corporate affairs from 2008 to 2010 and in March 2024 became principal private secretary to Prime Minister Anthony Albanese. Olivia Wirth joined Qantas in 2009 after working for the Liberal frontbencher Joe Hockey and went on to run its loyalty business. Moksha Watts, an adviser to Albanese, had earlier been head of government affairs at Jetstar, head of sustainability and industry affairs at Qantas, and corporate affairs chief at Virgin Australia. The newspaper reported in August 2025 that another of Albanese's senior advisers had joined Qantas's government and public affairs team, among the staff who left Parliament after that year's federal election.

Because such staff are employed in-house they are not listed on the federal register of lobbyists, and the Lobbying Code's cooling-off periods do not apply to them. The reporting followed a controversy over free flight upgrades and Chairman's Lounge memberships accepted by politicians. The independent senator David Pocock called for the system to be overhauled, saying it facilitated a "cosy relationship between politicians who are meant to be making the rules for industry and industry who don't want those rules made".

Movement between government and the banking and financial sector has attracted similar comment. Ken Henry, Secretary of the Treasury from 2001 to 2011, joined the board of the National Australia Bank later that year and was its chairman from 2015 until he resigned in February 2019, days after the Hayne royal commission criticised the bank's leadership. Mike Baird, a banker before entering politics, became the bank's chief customer officer for corporate and institutional banking about six weeks after resigning as Premier of New South Wales in January 2017. In the same month the Australian Bankers' Association appointed the former Premier of Queensland Anna Bligh as its chief executive, an appointment reported to have angered the federal treasurer, Scott Morrison, who denied cancelling meetings with the major banks in response. Former treasurer Josh Frydenberg joined Goldman Sachs as a senior regional adviser in 2022 and became chairman of its Australian and New Zealand business in 2023, and two governors of the Reserve Bank of Australia, Ian Macfarlane and Glenn Stevens, joined the boards of ANZ and Macquarie Group five and fourteen months respectively after leaving the central bank, Stevens becoming Macquarie's chairman in 2022. Movement at staff level is also routine: a former policy adviser to Albanese became director of government relations at the Australian Banking Association in August 2025.

Appointments have also run the other way. Chairs of the Australian Securities and Investments Commission have included the former Société Générale executive Greg Medcraft and, from 2021, Joe Longo, who had been the commission's national director of enforcement from 1996 to 2001 before spending 17 years as a general counsel at Deutsche Bank; Geoff Summerhayes was an executive board member of the Australian Prudential Regulation Authority from 2016 to 2021, having been chief executive of Suncorp Life, and in 2022 joined the boards of several insurers the authority regulates. Writing after the royal commission, the economist Richard Holden argued that the "revolving door between regulators and the regulated" contributes to regulatory capture, and Transparency International Australia has called for the cooling-off period to be extended to three years. The Lobbying Code restricts lobbying rather than employment by a regulated business, and no approval is required for such appointments.

=== European Union ===
There are different rules applied regarding the institution/agency/body involved.

==== Applying rules ====
The general principle is the following: the Staff Regulation and Article 339 of the Treaty on the Functioning of the European Union apply to all EU officials. However, each institution/body/agency has to adopt its own internal rules and to annually report on the implementation of art. 16 Staff Regulation addressing the revolving doors problem.

This Staff Regulation addresses the rights and obligations of officials, such as their duty of impartiality and loyalty (art. 11). Therefore, the Appointing authority shall examine if there is no conflict of interest undermining the EU official's independence either when recruiting them or when they come back after a break. Moreover, EU officials must not have any direct or indirect involvement in matters that may impair their independence (art. 11 a). Also, if they are engaging in an outside activity (paid or unpaid) or any assignment during their mandate, EU officials must seek the authorization of the Appointing authority. It shall be refused if it impairs with the EU officials' duties or the institutions' interests (art. 12b). Finally, EU official's duties to integrity and discretion continue to stand even after leaving service (art. 16). There is a cooling-off period of two years within which they must notify their intention to engage in a new activity to their institution, aiming at constraining the revolving door problem. Finally, EU officials shall refrain from any unauthorized disclosure of information received in the line of their duty (art. 17). Article 339 TFEU highlights the obligation of professional secrecy, during and after EU officials' services.

===== European Commission =====
The commissioners are chosen according to their general competence, European commitment and independence "beyond doubts". They are also subject to different duties such as independence, integrity and discretion regarding the acceptance of certain benefits and or appointments during and after their mandate (art. 17 §3 TEU + 245 TFEU). If those duties of integrity and discretion are breached, they may be subject to judicial proceedings leading to the suspension of their pension and/or other rights or to be compulsorily retired (art. 245 + 247 TFEU).

The Commission established its own Code of Conduct in 1999. It was revised already in 2011 and then "reformed" after the Barroso Case in 2017 (cfr infra). This last version has been applied since the 1st February 2018. The key features concern the declaration of interest, transparency, the cooling-off period and the "new" Independent Ethical Committee.

- First, each commissioner, before being appointed, has to fulfil a declaration of interests, which is revised each year and made public. It aims at highlighting financial interests that may give rise to conflicts of interest, any function occupied during the past 10 years, and pointing to affiliation to organisms susceptible to influencing the exercise of their public mandate. It may concern spouses and minor children, if needed (art. 3). Those are the main areas of inquiry during the European Parliament's hearings prior to the effective nomination of a commissioner. If such a conflict of interest emerges, there is a procedure that may end with a recusation (art. 4).
- Second, commissioners can only meet with people registered in the Transparency Register when those meetings fall within the scope provided by the 2014 Interinstitutional Agreement between the European Parliament and the European Commission (art. 7): "activities concerning the provision of legal and other professional advice are not covered" (point 10). This register is not comprehensive since its material scope does not cover all activities influencing the decision-making process, the formulation and implementation of EU law. Therefore, the European Parliament, the Commission and the Council of the EU (for the first time) reached a compromise agreement on a mandatory Transparency Register since 15/12/2020, but still has to be formally adopted.
- Thirdly, there is a cooling-off period of 2 years during which two months' notice is required before taking any job/benefits or appointments (art. 11, §2). If the activity is related to the commissioner's previous portfolio or seems to be contrary to art. 245 TFEU, the Independent Ethical Committee must be consulted. However, there is no authorization needed in some cases explicitly addressed in an exhaustive list (art. 11, §3). Moreover, ex-commissioners are barred from performing direct lobbying but only for 2 years (art. 11, §4). If the person concerned was the former president, the cooling-off period has been extended to 3 years (art. 11, §5). Still, there is no cooling period if it concerns public service, meaning that the ex-commissioner can take a public service job without any cooling off period (art. 11, §6).
- Finally, the previous "Ad Hoc Ethical Committee" has been renamed "Independent Ethical Committee". Its members are appointed by the commission on the proposal of the president, and their deliberations are confidential while their opinions/final decisions are made public (art. 12). If the commissioners or the president breached their duties and the cooling-off period, but the material scope does not enter into the application of art. 245 or 247 TFEU, then the concerned person may be reprimanded, even publicly, by the commission. In accordance with art. 16 of the Staff Regulation, an annual report has to be published, including the work of the committee (art. 13). Also, the president may ask the commissioner to resign (art. 17, §6 TUE).

===== European Parliament =====
In its 2005 Statute for the Members of the European Parliament (MEPs), general principles and duties are laid down. Indeed, MEPs should remain free and independent (art. 2), they must not be pressured or exert any binding mandate (art. 3) and "safeguard their independence" (art. 9).

The European Parliament has also established its own Code of Conduct, which has been applied since 1 January 2012. Here, the code provides an explicit definition of "conflict of interest" (art. 3). MEPs must also establish a declaration of financial interests (art. 4). Former MEPs' activities may involve lobbying but must be notified to the European Parliament. Consequently, those MEPs involved in lobbying must not benefit from the facilities granted to other former MEPs (art. 6), such as entering the Parliament's building, using Parliament's restaurants and cafeteria, libraries, documentation centers or car parks. In the same vein of the commission, there is also an advisory committee that must, in accordance with article 16 of the Staff Regulation, publish an annual report (art. 7). If there is an alleged breach, the President of the European Parliament refers to the advisory committee, which may conduct an audition and then refer back to the president on what can be done. The member under investigation may give a written opinion to the president and then the president issues a reasoned decision (art. 8). There is an exhaustive list of the penalties in art. 166§3 to §5 of the Rules of Procedures. Since April 2013, the European Parliament has adopted implementing measures of the "Code of Conduct on Gifts received in an official capacity, Invitations to events organised by third parties and Monitoring procedure".

Since 31/01/2019, the EP has also amended its Rules of Procedure, saying that "rapporteurs, shadow rapporteurs or committee chairs shall, for each report, publish online all scheduled meetings with interest representatives falling under the scope of the Transparency Register

If the European Parliament's Code of Conduct seems permissive (e.g. there is any cooling-off period), the Parliament is concerned by the revolving door effect and has used its power over other institutions to prevent them. In some cases, the EP must give its approval for the appointment of the leaders/officials of other European agencies, for instance, the European Supervisory Authorities. In January 2020, the Parliament stopped an entering revolving door: it declined to approve the Irish central Banker Gerry Cross from becoming executive director of the European Banking Authority (EBA) because of his lobbying past within the financial lobby group Association for Financial Markets in Europe (AFME).

==== Critics and developments ====
Former EU Commissioners passing through the revolving door attract much attention, but such situations occur in every EU institution, not only the Commission. The European Union is said to have a permissive culture. It has often waived its own rules to allow revolvers to have a job in the institutions or to be employed in the private sector after their term in office. People going through the revolving door bring industry expertise and insight that can be valuable for regulators, and it can sometimes be conceptualized as an educational process by researchers working on the topic. The European Union combines very technical domains where such specific knowledge and competences could be valuable. There is a tension between the need for expertise and the resort to the revolving door to obtain this knowledge.

However, the EU has been pressured to address the issue more convincingly and to reform its rules, which are sometimes qualified as weak. The code of Conduct of the Commission has been reformed after the Barosso Gate. This can be seen as progress in regulating the issue, but these efforts may be perceived as insufficient. Indeed, the cooling-off period after employment in the Union lasts for 18 months. In contrast, other countries have stricter rules. For instance, former Canadian officials are to wait 5 years after their term to engage in any lobbying activities. The European Parliament has also taken steps to close the revolving door blocking the nomination of Gerry Cross as executive director of the European Banking Authority.

According to a report by Transparency International - EU Office, which analysed the career paths of 485 former Members of the European Parliament and 27 former European Commissioners, the revolving door phenomenon is present at the EU level as well. The report Access All Areas finds that 30% of the 161 MEPs who left politics for other employment were employed by organisations which were registered on the EU Transparency Register at the start of 2017. At the same time, the report found that 15 out of 27 Commissioners who finished their service in 2014 entered employment with organisations on the EU lobby register after the end of their 18-month cooling-off period. The report also notes that the regulatory framework surrounding the revolving door phenomenon in the European Union could be improved by a stronger ethics framework, notably an independent ethics body which would decide which professional activities are subject to a conflict of interest.

===== Goldman Sachs =====
Goldman Sachs, the investment bank, is known to use the revolving doors in the US as well as with former EU officials to gain expertise and/or inside information on EU regulatory matters. There are several examples of revolvers between the European Union and the bank.

Peter Sutherland was a Commissioner responsible for Competition Policy between 1985 and 1989. He left the commission to found the World Trade Organization and became its first president during his cool-off period from 1993 to 1995. In July 1995, he became Chairman of Goldman Sachs.

Mario Draghi is an Italian politician. He worked in the Italian Treasury but then left to become vice chairman and managing director of the Goldman Sachs international division. In this branch, he dealt with European corporations and governments. He also led Goldman Sachs's European strategy. Mario Draghi left the bank when he was appointed president of the European Central Bank in 2011.

Mario Monti is an Italian economist and politician. He was appointed as commissioner for the Internal Market under the Santer Commission (1995-1999) and for Competition under Romano Prodi (1999-2004). He started serving on the board of international advisers of the bank in 2002 during his term. In November 2011, Mario Monti came back in the public sphere to lead the Italian government formed by technocrats in the sovereign debt crisis.

The revolving door that received the most media coverage in Europe concerns José Manuel Barroso, president of the European Commission for 2 consecutive terms between 2004 and 2014. He led the commission during the 2008 subprime crisis and helped oversee the financial reforms that followed the economic collapse. In 2016, after his cool-off period he announced his move towards the investment bank. He became the non-executive chairman. His hiring was so controversial that the Juncker Commission referred the case to the commission's Ad Hoc Ethic Committee.

===== Other controversies =====
In July 1999, Martin Bangemann the Commissioner for Industrial Affairs was suspended from his duties after his decision to accept a position with Telefónica, Spain largest telephone company. While he was still Commissioner he announced that he wanted to join the board of directors of Telefónica and that he would resign from the commission.The Commission judged that he should have resigned before negotiating his new functions with his future employer.

In 2004, Neelie Kroes was made Commissioner for Competition, in spite of having displayed 25 corporate jobs on her resume. Later on it was found that she also served 7 years as a lobbyist for an arms manufacturer, which she had not disclosed. After her 2 terms as commissioner for Competition and later on for Digital Agenda and her cooling period she applied for a job in the industry she previously regulated.

Adam Farkas was executive director of the European Banking Authority. He left his occupation to become head of the Association for Financial Markets in Europe (AFME), a powerful financial lobby. The European Banking Authority disregarded conflict of interest and let him go without a cooling period. A complaint was lodged to the Ombudsman of the EU and it was concluded that the EBA should not have allowed that move.

=== France ===
A law in the penal code of France governing public officials who move between the public and private sectors requires a three-year wait between working in the government and taking a job in the private sector.

=== Hong Kong ===
In 2008, the appointment of Leung Chin-man as executive director of New World China Land led to much controversy. Leung was previously a senior civil servant and administrative officer in charge of lands. His appointment as an executive director of a subsidiary of a land developer led to allegations of collusion of interests and delayed interests. He resigned after two weeks, and the territory's Legislative Council had, for years, an inquiry into the matter.

=== Japan ===
Amakudari (天下り, amakudari; "descent from heaven") is the institutionalized practice where Japanese senior bureaucrats retire to high-profile positions in the private and public sectors. The practice was increasingly viewed as corrupt and a drag on unfastening the ties between private sector and state which prevent economic and political reforms.

In April 2007, a law to phase out amakudari prohibits ministries from attempting to place bureaucrats in industry with implementation in 2009. However, the law also removed a two-year ban that prevented retiring officials from taking jobs with companies with which they had official dealings during the five years before retirement.

==== Definition ====
The term's literal meaning, "descent from heaven," refers to Shinto myths of gods descending from heaven to earth; the modern usage employs it as a metaphor, where "heaven" refers to the upper echelons of the civil service, the civil servants are the deities, and the earth is the private-sector corporations. In amakudari, senior civil servants retire to join organizations linked with or under the jurisdiction of their ministries or agencies when they reach mandatory retirement age, usually between 50 and 60 in the public service. The former officials may collude with their former colleagues to help their new employers secure government contracts, avoid regulatory inspections and generally secure preferential treatment from the bureaucracy.

Amakudari may also be a reward for preferential treatment provided by officials to their new employers during their term in the civil service. Some government organisations are said to be expressly maintained for the purpose of hiring retiring bureaucrats and paying them high salaries at taxpayers' expense.

In the strictest meaning of amakudari, bureaucrats retire into private companies. In other forms bureaucrats move into government corporations (横滑り yokosuberi, lit. 'sideslip'), are granted successive public and private sector appointments (渡り鳥 wataridori, lit. 'migratory bird') or may become politicians, including becoming members of parliament (政界転身 seikai tenshin).

Political scientists have identified amakudari as a central feature of Japan's political and economic structure. The practice is thought to bind private and public sector in a tight embrace and prevent political and economic change.

==== History ====
Amakudari is widespread in many branches of the Japanese government but is subject to government efforts to regulate the practice. Pressure to reduce amakudari retirement to corporations may be leading to an increase in bureaucrats retiring to other public sector organisations instead.

Amakudari was a minor issue before World War II since government officials could be outplaced to a large number of industrial organization that were nationalized. However, reforms during the Occupation of Japan eliminated most of these nationalized organizations resulting in a need to outplace individuals to the private sector. Such outplacement is inevitable in a personnel system where traditional Confucian values prevent one who entered the organization at the same time as another to become his subordinate

A 1990 study suggested that amakudari retirements to large companies by bureaucrats from prominent ministries, such as the Ministry of Finance, had peaked in 1985 but that the practice was on the increase by bureaucrats from other types of government organisations such as the National Tax Agency. As a result, the percentage of former bureaucrats on the boards of private-sector listed companies had remained stable at 2%.

A series of scandals in the mid-1990s focused the media spotlight on amakudari. In the 1994 general contracting (zenekon) scandal, corruption was uncovered among bureaucrats associated with building contractors, leading to the jailing of high-ranking politician Shin Kanemaru for tax evasion. In the mortgage scandal of 1996, Japanese housing lenders went on a lending spree and racked up bad debts worth 6 trillion yen ($65.7 billion) sparking a financial crisis. The industry was supposed to be regulated by the Ministry of Finance, but the presence of its former officials in top jobs at the lenders is thought to have deflected oversight.

It wasn't until the next decade that Japanese prime ministers responded with policies to limit amakudari, although it is unclear whether these policies are having any effect. In July 2002, Prime Minister Junichiro Koizumi ordered that strict amakudari be ended, because of its association with corruption between business and politics. Koizumi's successor, Prime Minister Shinzo Abe enacted new rules as part of a policy pledge to completely eradicate amakudari in 2007, but his reforms were criticised as toothless (see below) and a campaign ploy for Upper House elections in July 2007.

While policy has focused on limiting amakudari to private companies, the number of bureaucrats retiring to jobs at other government organisations (yokosuberi or "sideslip") has surged reaching 27,882 appointments in 2006 up 5,789 on the previous year. These organisations, numbering 4,576, received 98 percent of the expenses for state projects without being subject to the bidding processes faced by private companies.

Over 50 years ending in 2010, 68 high-level government bureaucrats have taken jobs with electricity suppliers after retirement from their government positions. In 2011, 13 retired government bureaucrats were employed in senior positions in Japanese electric utilities.

==== Legal status ====
Amakudari is subject to rules which were revised in April 2007 in response to corruption scandals. Under the new rules, ministries are instructed to slowly stop helping bureaucrats land new jobs over three years starting in 2009. Instead, a job center to be set up by the end of 2008 would take on the role, and government agencies and ministries will be prohibited from brokering new jobs for retirees.

However, the law removed a two-year ban that prevented retiring officials from taking jobs with companies with which they had official dealings during the five years before retirement, which may increase amakudari. It also left considerable loopholes, including not placing restrictions on watari in which retired bureaucrats move from one organization to another. Bureaucrats could retire to a job at another government agency, and then switch jobs to a private company later. Critics say that the government could better prevent Amakudari by raising the retirement age for bureaucrats above 50.

In October 2006, 339 public entities were violating the guidelines concerning amakudari, a figure 38 times higher than the number for the previous year. This declined to 166 by July 2007.

==== Impact ====
As well as scandals, the effects of amakudari have been documented by a sizable body of research.

Some studies find that amakudari promotes more risky business activities. A 2001 study found that banks with amakudari employees were found to behave less prudently the more retired civil servants they employed (measured by the capital-asset ratio, an indicator of the prudential behaviour of banks).

Many studies find that companies with amakudari employees are subjected to less oversight by public agencies. Around 70 percent of public contracts awarded to organisations that employed hired retired bureaucrats through amakudari were given without a bidding process in 2005. The contracts were worth a total 233 billion yen. By contrast 18 percent of private companies that didn't have ex-bureaucrats on the payroll got contracts without bidding.

=== New Zealand ===
There is no major legislation against revolving door practices in New Zealand, but some ad hoc provisions exist in relation to certain industries. For example, a scandal in which MP Taito Phillip Field was jailed for corruption in relation to improper use of his government position to benefit from helping people with immigration applications was influential in the creation of a restraint of trade clause in the Immigration Advisers Licensing Act 2007. The Act prohibits Ministers of Immigration, Associate Ministers of Immigration and immigration officials from becoming a licensed immigration adviser for one year after leaving government employment.

There is also no cooling off period for public officials before they can enter the lobbying industry in New Zealand, allowing politicians and Parliamentary staffers to immediately become lobbyists after leaving office. Kris Faafoi joined a lobbying firm just three months after leaving Parliament, where he had been justice and broadcasting minister. Gordon-Jon Thompson took a leave of absence from his lobbying firm to work as chief of staff to Prime Minister Jacinda Ardern for four months before returning to his lobbying firm.

Transparency International (TI) criticized the lack of oversight in the New Zealand lobbying industry in a November 2022 report as lax.

=== Singapore ===
Similar to Japan's "amakudari" concept, Singaporeans use the phrase "parachuted generals/ officials" to refer to the tradition of high ranking generals of Singapore Armed Forces landing in executive posts in statutory boards and large government-linked corporations. For example,

- Ng Yat Chung, former Chief of Defence Force, became CEO of Singtel which is the largest telecommunication operator in the country.
- Desmond Kuek, former Chief of Army, became CEO of SMRT which is the main public transport operator of the city-state.
- Bey Soo Khiang, former Chief of Defence Force, became CEO of ST Engineering.

=== United Kingdom ===
The movement of senior civil servants and government ministers into business roles is overseen by the Advisory Committee on Business Appointments (ACOBA), but it is not a statutory body and has only advisory powers. The Channel Four Dispatches programme 'Cabs for Hire', broadcast in early 2010, which showed several sitting members of Parliament and former ministers offering their influence and contacts in an effort to get lobbying jobs, has generated renewed concern about this issue. A Transparency International UK report on the subject, published in May 2011, called for ACOBA to be replaced by a statutory body with greater powers to regulate the post-public employment of former ministers and crown servants. It also argued that the committee should be more representative of society.

=== United States ===
"Under current law, government officials who make contracting decisions must either wait a year before joining a military contractor or, if they want to switch immediately, must start in an affiliate or division unrelated to their government work. One big loophole is that these restrictions do not apply to many high-level policy makers..., who can join corporations or their boards without waiting."

According to recent scholars,:

There are two main views regarding the importance of former government employees in the lobbying industry. The first view contends that revolving door lobbyists are valuable because "Washington is all about connections." In this view, experience in government allows former officials to develop a network of friends and colleagues that they can later exploit on behalf of their clients....A second view, often put forward by lobbyists themselves, is that the importance of individuals with prior government experience is due to higher innate ability and/or human capital accumulation. The higher expertise of revolving door individuals can refer to policy matters, the inner workings of the legislative process, or even the preferences of particular constituencies.

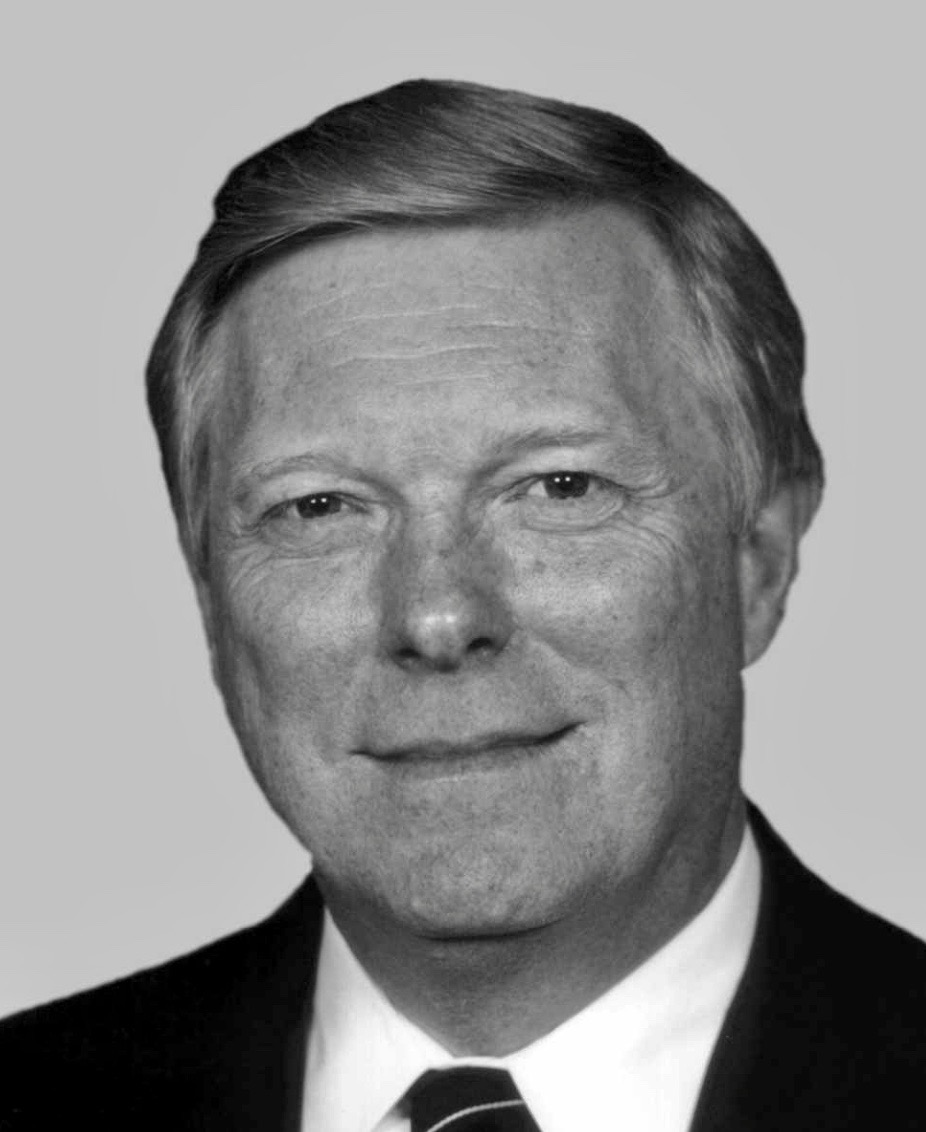
Democratic Representative Dick Gephardt became a lobbyist in 2007 after he left office.

Examples of individuals who have moved between roles in this way in sensitive areas include Dick Cheney (military contracting), Linda Fisher (pesticide and biotech), Philip Perry (homeland security), Pat Toomey, Billy Tauzin (pharmaceutical industry), Dan Coats, John C. Dugan, a Department of the Treasury official in the administration of President George H. W. Bush who pressed for banking deregulation and repeal of Glass-Steagall Act, then as counsel to the American Bankers Association lobbied for the Gramm-Leach-Bliley Act of 1999 repealing key provisions of the Glass-Steagall Act, and then starting in 2005 returned in a senior government role as Comptroller of the Currency, and former FCC commissioner Meredith Attwell Baker (media lobbying). High-profile Democratic Representative Dick Gephardt left office to become a lobbyist and his lobbying agency, Gephardt Government Affairs Group, earned close to $7 million in revenues in 2010 from clients including Goldman Sachs, Boeing, Visa Inc., Ameren Corporation, and Waste Management Inc.

==== Securities and Exchange Commission ====
Many former commissioners of the Securities and Exchange Commission and SEC employees have also been employed by private firms in the industry they once regulated. Former chairman Jay Clayton currently serves on the board of Apollo Global Management as the lead independent director. Citadel Securities has employed numerous former SEC employees, including Stephen Luparello as its general counsel and adviser, Ryan VanGrack as its deputy chief legal officer, David Glocker as its chief compliance officer, and Gregg Berman as director of research. As of 2021, Robinhood Markets employed former commissioner Daniel M. Gallagher as chief legal officer, former chief of staff to the chairman Lucas Moskowitz as deputy general counsel, and staff attorneys Justin Daly and Benjamin Brown as lobbyists.

Major financial institutions also hire former SEC attorneys as lead counsel, including Stephen M. Cutler at JPMorgan Chase, Gary Lynch at Bank of America, and Richard Walker at Deutsche Bank.

==== Link to the subprime mortgage crisis ====
The subprime crisis erupted in 2007 after several years of unsafe lending and speculation by US banks. In order to revive their economy and real estate loans banks began to grant loans to households that did not meet credit score criteria. Subprime loans are a type of mortgage offered to individuals who do not qualify for traditional loans due to poor credit ratings and therefore pay larger interests rates in order to compensate for the extra risk taken by the lender. The crisis occurred in 2008, property prices eventually collapsed whilst the aforementioned interest rates rose. Households had reached their maximum debt capacity, thus defaulting on their loans and further increasing their debts. As a result, real estate assets were seized, which exacerbated the fall in the housing market. This, in turn, led to a fall in investor and institutional confidence and a collapse of the stock market, ultimately developing into the 2008 financial crisis.

The revolving doors were significantly prevalent in the financial sector and were cited by the OECD and some non-governmental organisations as one of the main causes of the 2008 financial crisis. This crisis was preceded by the US financial sector entering more and more into cooperation with federal regulators agencies. Through the process of the revolving doors not only Wall Street veterans occupied key positions in Washington, but it also fostered the development of strong personal connections between senior bankers and high government officials, which gave the so-called "too-big-to-fail" banks, privileged access to decisions-makers and contributed to promoting the Wall Street worldview in the political world. They were finally able to persuade the policymakers that the deregulation of the financial sector was in the public interest and did not only serve their self-interest.

It is striking that a particularly large number of revolving door movements took place in 2007 and 2008. Figures show that mainly public-to-private movements, that is to say, the transition from politics to the private sector, were completed.

== See also ==
- E-governance
- Interlocking directorate
- Military–industrial complex
- Pantouflage
- Political capitalism
- Jeon-gwan ye-u
- Government-business relations in Japan
- Regulatory capture
