= Auguste Laugel =

French historian and engineer

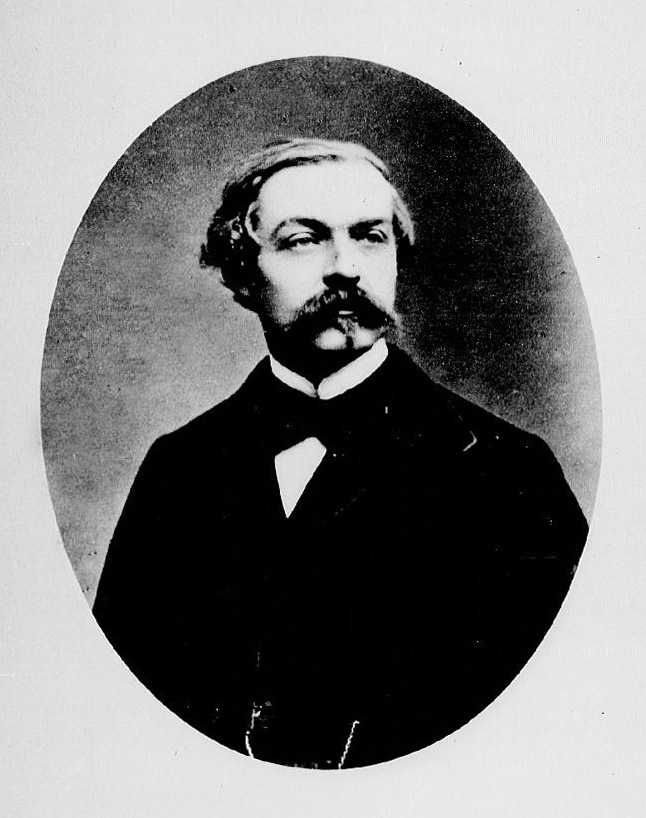
Auguste Laugel

Antoine-Auguste Laugel (20 January 1830 – 1914) was a French historian and engineer born in Strasbourg.

He received his education at the École polytechnique in Paris, and for a period of time was secretary and confidant to the Duke of Aumale. Later he was appointed director of the Chemins de fer de Paris à Lyon et à la Méditerranée (PLM), a French railway company.

He published articles in various journals such as the Revue des Deux Mondes, where he penned an important account of Darwin's On the Origin of Species in 1860. He was the author of numerous historical and philosophical works.

== Written works ==
- Études scientifiques: le pôle Nord et les découvertes arctiques, le pôle austral et les expéditions antarctiques (Scientific studies: the North Pole and Arctic discoveries, the South Pole and Antarctic expeditions); (1859)
- Science et philosophie (Science and philosophy); (1862)
- Les Problèmes de la nature (Problems of nature); (1867)
- Les États-Unis pendant la guerre (1861-1865) (The United States during the War of 1861–1865); (1866)
- La Voix, l'oreille et la musique d'après les travaux de M. Helmholtz (Voice, hearing and music from the work of Helmholtz); (1867)
- Les Problèmes de la vie (Problems of life); (1867)
- Les Problèmes de l'âme (Problems of the soul); (1868)
- L'Optique et les arts (Optics and the arts); (1869)
- Italie, Sicile, Bohême: notes de voyage (Italy, Sicily and Bohemia: Notes of the voyage); (1872)
- L'Angleterre politique et sociale (England and social policy); (1873)
- Grandes Figures historiques: Guillaume d'Orange. Jean de Barneveld. Un fondateur de la monarchie belge: Sylvain Van de Weyer. Les Confessions de John Stuart Mill. Le dernier des féderalistes américains: Josiah Quincy. Un homme d'État américain: Charles Sumner (Major Historical Figures: William of Orange. John of Barneveld. A founder of the Belgian Monarchy: Sylvain Van de Weyer. The confessions of John Stuart Mill. The last of the American Federalists: Josiah Quincy. A man of the American States: Charles Sumner); (1875)
- Lord Palmerston et lord Russel (Lord Palmerston and Lord Russell); (1876)
- La France politique et sociale (France and social policy); (1877)
- La Réforme au XVIe siècle, études et portraits (The Reformation in the sixteenth century, studies and portraits); (1881)
- Fragments d'histoire: Philippe II, Catherine de Médicis, Coligny, don Juan d'Autriche, Alexandre Farnèse, Gustave-Adolphe et Richelieu. Paris. 1886. ("Fragments of History: Philip II, Catherine de Medici, Coligny, Don Juan of Austria, Alexander Farnese, Gustave Adolphe and Richelieu")
- Henri de Rohan, son rôle politique et militaire sous Louis XIII (1579-1638) (Henri de Rohan, his political and military role under Louis XIII, 1579–1638) (1889)
- Flammes et cendres (Flames and ashes); (1912)
