= Raymond Lévy =

French engineer and business executive (1927-2018)

- Born: 28 June 1927; Paris, France
- Died: 10 October 2018 (aged 91); Paris, France
- Education: École Polytechnique; École des Mines de Paris; Massachusetts Institute of Technology
- Occupation: Business executive
- Known for: CEO of Renault (1986–1992)

Raymond Lévy (28 June 1927 – 10 October 2018) was a French engineer and business executive. He served as chairman and chief executive officer of Renault from 1986 to 1992, guiding the company through a period of restructuring and recovery after the assassination of his predecessor Georges Besse.

== Early life and education ==
Lévy was born in Paris in 1927. He studied at the École polytechnique and the Mines Paris – PSL, later earning a Master of Science degree at the Massachusetts Institute of Technology.

== Career ==
Lévy began his career in the French mining administration before moving into industry. He held senior positions at the oil group Elf Aquitaine (vice-president, 1976–1980) and at the steel company Usinor (chairman, 1982–1984).

In December 1986, following the assassination of Renault CEO Georges Besse by the militant group Action directe, Lévy was appointed chairman and chief executive officer of Renault. He led the company until 1992, focusing on restructuring, divesting non-core businesses, and preparing Renault for eventual privatization. His tenure is also associated with the launch of the Renault Twingo, a model that became emblematic of the brand's revival.
