= Charles Emile Wickersheimer =

French mining engineer

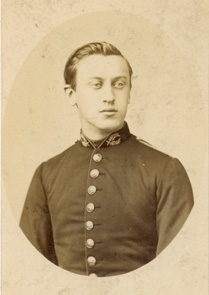
- Wickersheimer as a Polytechnique student c. 1870

Deputy for Aude
- In office 18 October 1885 – 11 November 1889

Deputy for Ariège
- In office 20 April 1893 – 14 October 1893

Personal details
- Born: 22 February 1849 Handschuheim, Bas-Rhin, France
- Died: 18 November 1915 (aged 66) Le Vésinet, Yvelines, France
- Occupation: Politician

Charles Emile Wickersheimer (22 February 1849 – 18 November 1915) was a French mining engineer who served as a deputy in the National Assembly from 1885 to 1889, elected on a left-wing platform, and was again a deputy for a brief period in 1893. He became a chief inspector of mines, a member of the public railway network, and was responsible for the Paris quarries.

== Early years (1849–85) ==
Charles Emile Wickersheimer was born on 22 February 1849 in the small village of Handschuheim near Strasbourg, Bas-Rhin. His parents were Charles Wickersheimer, a teacher, and Louise Hild. His brother, Charles-Ernest Wickersheimer (1851–1924), became an army doctor. His father was the village schoolmaster, but soon obtained a teaching post in the town of Strasbourg, where Charles Emile attended the lycée. He joined the École Polytechnique in the promotion of 1868. He was described in the school's register as "Light brown hair, no beard, strong nose, blue eyes, small mouth, dimpled chin, oval face". He graduated in 1870 to enter the École des Mines de Paris, but left to volunteer in the army during the Franco-Prussian War of 1870.

After the war Wickersheimer entered the École des Mines on 19 June 1871, and graduated as an ordinary mining engineer on 30 May 1874. He joined the Corps des mines, and was appointed to the ordinary service of the mines of the Aude and the Pyrénées-Orientales. He was named engineer of the mines of Carcassonne, Aude. He married Marie Charry of Pamiers during his 8-year time as engineer of the Carcassonne mines. While at Carcasonne he was involved in the project for a maritime canal in Le Midi, which he popularized in public speeches.

Wickersheimer was promoted to 1st class mining engineer in 1883. He was appointed engineer for mines and steam engines for the Seine department, and was put in charge of the Chemins de fer de Paris à Lyon et à la Méditerranée. In 1883 he filed a patent for the perforation of mining galleries and in 1886 filed a patent for the locks of large navigation canals. He became politically radical, and was appointed municipal councilor and administrator of the hospices.

== Deputy (1885–93) ==
Wickersheimer ran in the elections of 4 and 18 October 1885 on the radical list for the department of Aude, and was elected on the second round. He sat on the far left. He was opposed to the 1883 agreements with the railway companies. He campaigned vigorously for nationalization of the railway network. He fought the proposed surtax on cereals, voted for the expulsion of the princes, against indefinite postponement of constitutional revision, for prosecution of three deputies of the far-right Ligue des Patriotes, against the proposed Lisbonne law (Note: The 29 July 1881 law defining freedom of the press is named the Loi Lisbonne after its rapporteur, the deputy Eugène Lisbonne.) defining and restricting the freedom of the press, for the prosecution of General Georges Ernest Boulanger. On 28 November 1886 Wickersheimer attacked the 1810 mining law, saying "The State has no right to commit future generations; to say that mining property is property like any other is an obvious mistake."

Wickersheimer ran for reelection in 1889 for the 2nd district of Carcassonne, but was defeated by Théron. On 20 April 1893 he ran in the by-election caused by the death of Lasbeysses, deputy for the Pamiers constituency of the Ariège department, and decisively defeated Julien Dumas in the second round. In the general elections of 10 August 1893 he was narrowly defeated by Julien Dumas, and retired from politics.

== Later career (1893–1915) ==
Wickersheimer was appointed chief engineer in 1890. In 1896 he was appointed a member of the Council of the Public Railway Network, where he remained until 1909. From 1896 to 1907 he was inspector general of the Paris quarries, the last inspector-general to be a Freemason. He was made an office of the Legion of Honour. During World War I (1914–18) he was appointed lieutenant colonel in the artillery, responsible for inspection of ammunition manufacture. Charles Emile Wickersheimer died at the age of 66 on 18 November 1915 in Le Vésinet, Yvelines.

== Publications ==
Wickersheimer was a member of the Société de géographie de Toulouse, and published articles on science and mining legislation in the society's bulletin. His studies included Etude du baromètre (1876), Législation des mines (1877), Notice sur la mine de Cardacet (1877), Voyage en Alsace-Lorraine (1884), Terrain glaciaire des Pyrénées Orientales (1885), Mines de pyrites dans la commune de Rouairoux (Tarn) (1886) and l'Alliance franco-russe (1892). Other publications include:

- Émile Wickersheimer (1886), "Le Canal des deux mers", Revue de l'Afrique française, Paris: 25
- Émile Wickersheimer (1890), L'Europe en 1890, Paris: E. Plon, Nourrit et Cie, p. 317
- Émile Wickersheimer (1890), "L'Aluminium et ses alliages", Encyclopédie chimique de Frémy, Paris: Vve C. Dunod, p. 95
- Émile Wickersheimer (1892), Étude sur le rachat des chemins de fer d'Orléans, de l'Ouest, de l'Est et du Midi, construction de 20 000 kilomètres de chemins de fer économiques, preface by Camille Pelletan, Paris: impr. de Chaix, p. 215
- Émile Wickersheimer (1898), Ville de Versailles. Service des eaux, Versailles: impr. de Aubert, p. 91
- Paul Weiss; Émile Wickersheimer (June 1903), "Notice sur la consolidation des anciennes carrières sous le tracé des lignes métropolitaines dans l'enceinte de Paris", Annales des mines, Paris: Vve C. Dunod: 27
- Émile Wickersheimer (1904), Étude théorique et pratique sur la vaporisation, méthode pour augmenter considérablement le rendement des générateurs à vapeur, Paris: Vve C. Dunod, p. 76
- Émile Wickersheimer (1905), Les Principes de la mécanique, Paris: Vve C. Dunod, p. 130
- Émile Wickersheimer (1906), À propos du rachat du chemin de fer de l'Ouest, industries d'État, administrations privées, Paris: H. Dunod et E. Pinat, p. 40
- Émile Wickersheimer (1907), Considérations économiques sur l'exploitation du pétrole en Roumanie, Paris: H. Dunod et E. Pinat, p. 59
- Émile Wickersheimer (1909), Essai théorique et pratique sur la vaporisation, méthode pour augmenter le rendement des générateurs à vapeur (3 ed.), Paris: H. Dunod et E. Pinat, p. 73

== Sources ==
- "Charles Emile WICKERSHEIMER (1849–1915)", Annales des Mines (in French)
- Charles, Emile Wickerscheimer (in French), Assemblée nationale
- Goldberg, Harvey (1958), "Jaurès and the Carmaux Strikes: The Coal Strike of 1892", The American Journal of Economics and Sociology, 17 (2): 167–178, doi:10.1111/j.1536-7150.1958.tb00239.x, JSTOR 3484674
- Jolly, Jean (1960–1977), "Wickerscheimer, Charles, Emile", Dictionnaire des parlementaires français de 1889 à 1940 (in French), Paris: Presses universitaires de France, ISBN 2-1100-1998-0
- P. (1886), "M. Wickersheimer", Revue alsacienne (in French), Nancy, Berger-Levrault et cie.
- Robert, Adolphe; Cougny, Gaston (1889), "Wickerscheimer (Charles, Emile)", Dictionnaire des parlementaires français de 1789 à 1889 (in French), Paris
