= Aimé Lepercq =

French politician (1889–1944)

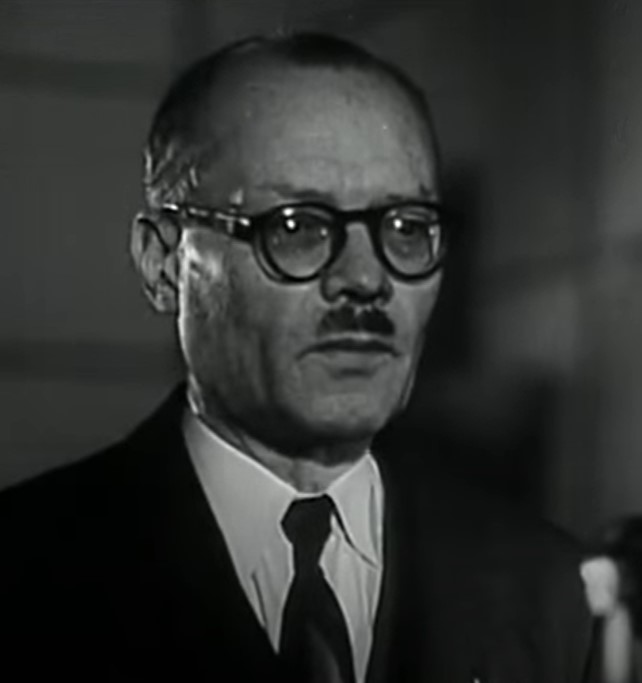
Aimé Lepercq (1889-1944)

Aimé Marie Antoine Lepercq (2 September 1889 – 9 November 1944) was a French soldier, French Resistance fighter, industrialist and political figure.

== Early life and education ==
Born in Collonges-au-Mont-d'Or (now part of the Metropolis of Lyon), as the eldest of nine children, he graduated from the École Polytechnique in 1911, and then the École des Mines.

== Military service ==
=== World War I ===
Lepercq fought in World War I, in which he was wounded three times and decorated for valor five times, becoming Chevalier de la Légion d'honneur in 1915 and receiving the British Armed Forces Military Cross. After the war, he worked as an administrator of industrial properties for the Škoda company in Czechoslovakia.

=== World War II ===
On the outbreak of World War II, Lepercq fought in the artillery during the battle of France, and continued to fight despite orders to no longer do so, until the actual Compiègne armistice of June, 1940. After a brief internment by the Germans, he returned to civil life as an industrial administrator, but was fired in 1943 for speaking out against the collaborationist administration and the Vichy regime, regarding the Service du travail obligatoire and deportations of Frenchmen to German labor camps.

Consequently, he became an active member of the French Resistance, commanding the Forces françaises de l'intérieur (FFI) in Île-de-France. Arrested again in 1944, he was set free due to the German authorities' failure to investigate, he took part in the Liberation of Paris (August of the same year), leading the FFI's attack on the Hôtel de Ville. For his role in the Resistance actions, he was made a Compagnon de la Libération; he was twice recipient of the Croix de Guerre, for his valor in both World Wars.

== Political career and death ==
He was selected by Charles de Gaulle as Minister of Finance, but died soon after in a car accident near Lille, and was replaced by René Pleven. He is buried in Cimetière des Batignolles.
