= Ours-Pierre-Armand Petit-Dufrénoy =

French geologist (1792–1857)

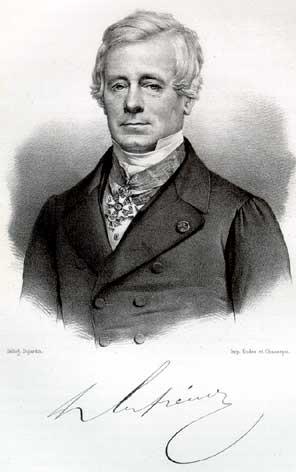
- Born: September 5, 1792; Sevran, France
- Died: March 20, 1857 (aged 64); Paris, France
- Resting place: Père Lachaise Cemetery; 48.860°N 2.396°E
- Other name: Pierre-Armand Dufrénoy
- Citizenship: France
- Education: École polytechnique, Mines ParisTech
- Scientific career
- Fields: Geology, Engineering, Mineralogy

Ours-Pierre-Armand Petit-Dufrénoy (5 September 1792 – 20 March 1857) was a French geologist and mineralogist.

== Education and career ==
He was born at Sevran, in the département of Seine-et-Oise. After leaving the Imperial Lyceum in 1811, he studied until 1813 at the École Polytechnique, and then entered the Corps des mines. He subsequently assisted in the management of the École des Mines, of which he was professor of mineralogy and afterwards director. He was also professor of geology at the École des Ponts et Chaussées.

In conjunction with Élie de Beaumont in 1841 he published a great geological map of France, the result of investigations carried on during thirteen years (1823–1836). Five years (1836–1841) were spent in writing the text to accompany the map, the publication of the work with two quarto volumes of text extending from 1841 to 1848; a third volume was issued in 1873. The two authors had already together published Voyage Métallurgique en Angleterre (1827, 2nd ed. 1837–1839), Mémoires pour servir a une description géologique de la France, in four vols. (1830–1838), and a Mémoire on Cantal and Mont-Dore (1833).

Other literary productions of Dufrénoy are an account of the iron mines of the eastern Pyrenees (1834), and a treatise on mineralogy (3 vols. and atlas, 1844–1845; 2nd ed., 4 vols. and atlas, 1856–1859), in which the geological relations as well as the physical and chemical properties of minerals were dealt with; he likewise contributed numerous papers to the Annales des mines and other scientific publications, one of the most interesting of which is entitled Des terrains volcaniques des environs de Naples. He occupied the chair of mineralogy of the Muséum national d'histoire naturelle from 1847 to 1857.

With André Brochant de Villiers and Elie de Beaumont, he visited England to study processes for mining and metallurgical production. Their observations were published in Les Annales des Mines. As an eminent professor of mineralogy, Dufrénoy returned to London to acquire the mineral collection created by Abbé Haüy, one of the founders of crystallography, and this acquisition lead to the mineralogical collection of the Muséum national d'histoire naturelle becoming one of the world's best.

== Honors and awards ==
Dufrénoy was a member of the Academy of Sciences, a commander of the Légion d'honneur, and an inspector-general of mines. In 1843 he received, along with Élie de Beaumont, the Wollaston medal from the Geological Society of London. In 1845 the newly discovered mineral dufrenoysite was named after him. There is a street in Paris named in his honor.

== Minerals described by Dufrénoy ==
- confolensite — synonym for halloysite
- manganèse silicaté rose — synonym for rhodonite
- fer carbonaté, 1827 — (synonym for chalybite), mixture of siderite and carbonaceous clays
- huréaulite, 1829
- nussièrite, 1835 — synonym for phosphohedyphane
