= André-Jean-François-Marie Brochant de Villiers =

French scientist (1772–1840)

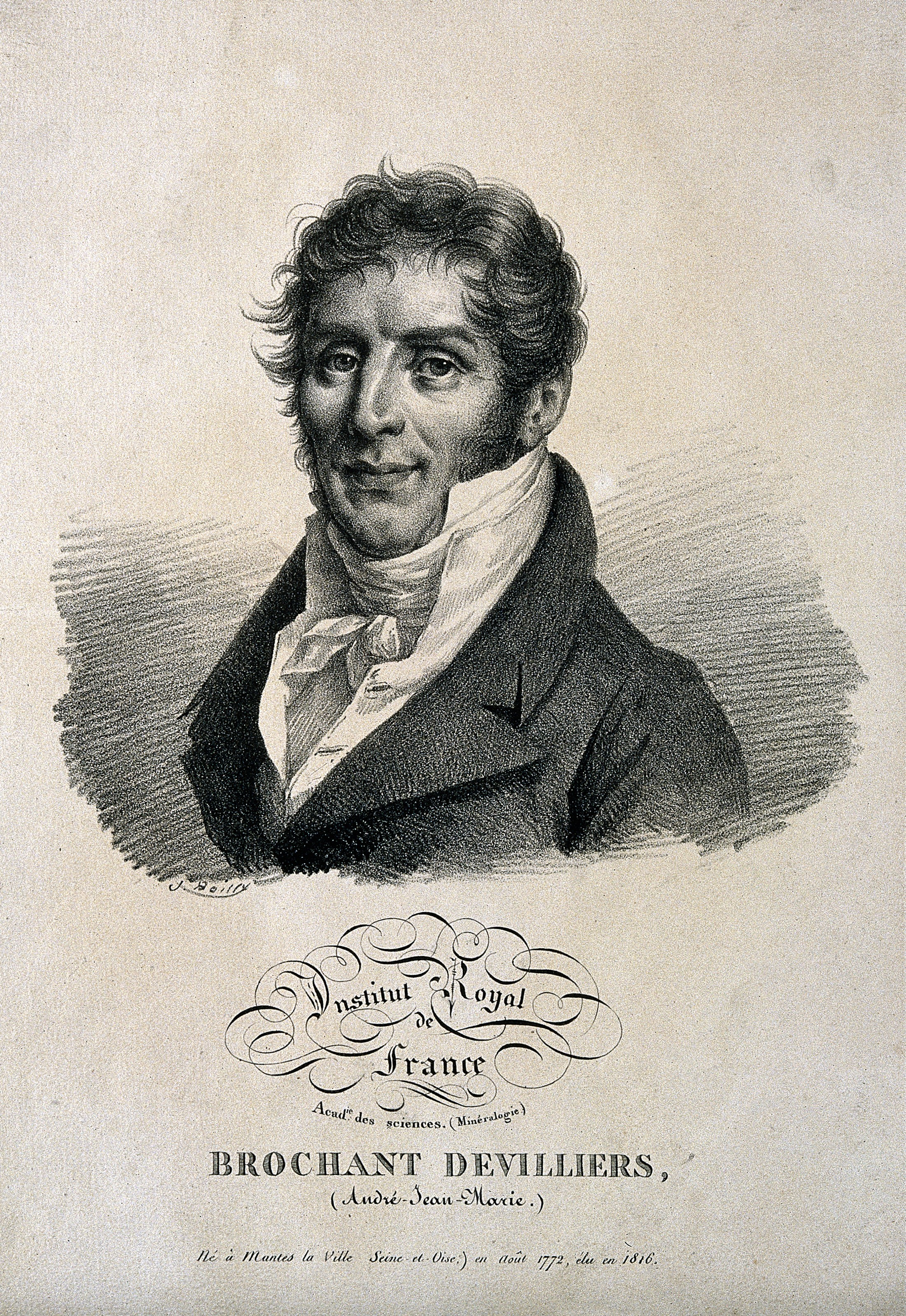
André Brochant de Villiers

André-Jean-François-Marie Brochant de Villiers (6 August 1772 – 16 May 1840) was a French mineralogist and geologist.

== Life ==
He was born at the Château de Villiers, near Mantes-la-Ville. After studying at the École Polytechnique, Paris, he was in 1794 the first pupil admitted to the École des Mines. In 1804, he was appointed professor of geology and mineralogy in the École des Mines, which had been temporarily transferred to Pezay in Savoy, and he returned with the school to Paris in 1815. Later on, he became inspector general of mines and a member of the Academy of Sciences.

He investigated the transition strata of the Tarantaise, wrote on the position of the granite rocks of Mont Blanc, and on the lead minerals of Derbyshire and Cumberland. He was charged with overseeing the construction of the geological map of France, undertaken by his pupils Dufrénoy and Elie de Beaumont.

Brochant de Villiers died in Paris on 16 May 1840.

== Publications ==
- Traité élémentaire de minéralogie (2 vols., 1801–1802; 2nd ed., 1808)
- Traité abrégé de cristallographie (Paris, 1818).
- De La Cristallisation Consideree Geometriquement et Physiquement (1819)
- Memoirs Pour Servir a une Description Geologique de la France (1830–38)
