= Walter Bitterlich =

Forest scientist and early Austrian Nazi Party member

- Born: February 19, 1908; Reutte, Austria
- Died: February 9, 2008 (aged 99); Reutte, Austria
- Education: University of Natural Resources and Life Sciences
- Known for: relascope
- Spouse: Ilse Bitterlich
- Children: 4
- Awards: honorary member, Society of American Foresters
- Scientific career
- Fields: Forestry
- Workplaces: University of Natural Resources and Life Sciences, Vienna, Austrian State Forestry Commission

Walter Bitterlich (German pronunciation: [ˈvaltɐ ˈbɪtɐlɪç]; February 19, 1908 – February 9, 2008) was an Austrian forestry scientist. He was the inventor of the relascope, a method for efficient forest inventory.

== Early career ==
Bitterlich descended from several generations of foresters and did much of his early work in the Tyrolean Alps of Austria.

Walter Bitterlich was the son of the forester Ernst Bitterlich and his wife Maria née Wachtel. Despite his upbringing in relative poverty, he successfully completed a forestry degree at Vienna's University of Natural Resources and Life Sciences in 1930 and the state exam for Higher Forest Service in 1933. Failing to find regular employment, he started volunteering with the Austrian State Forestry Commission.

== National Socialism ==
Bitterlich was an early member of the National Socialist German Workers' Party, joining in 1933 when it was illegal to do so in Austria. After the Anschluss of Austria in 1939 he became party member no. 511,075 (later changed to 1,618,531). Despite failing to pay party dues for several years, he was recognised as an illegal, or early, national socialist on the recommendation of his local chapter, which vouched for his deep commitment to the ideas of fascism. This was essential for gaining employment with the national forest service, where, in 1937, three of every four employees held that distinction. Thus qualified, he was made forest inspector of his native district of Reutte in 1938, 30 years after his father held the same position. In 1942 he was drafted into military service, first at the Eastern Front and, starting in 1943, Normandy. His war memoirs, published in 2003, describe the sense of adventure and camaraderie he found during this time and his insights into the application of military thinking to forest trees. They do not mention the party he eagerly joined a decade before.

After the war, the Nationalsozialistengesetz required his dismissal from public service. Unemployed and short on cash, he brought his young family to Salzburg, where they moved in with his parents. His fate soon turned, however, as Austria started to redefine its role as a victim, not perpetrator, of Nazi aggression. The 1947 changes to the law removed early party membership as a decisive factor in denazification and created a category of "minor offenders" that allowed many party members to resume their careers with little resistance. Thus, Bitterlich was reinstated in 1948, serving in Zell am See, and, from 1953 to 1967, Hallein.

== Scientific Career ==
Beginning in 1948, Bitterlich developed a method of plotless sampling for forest inventory. His process was first published in 1948 and presented at the World Forestry Congress in Helsinki the following year. Also in 1949, he was awarded a doctoral degree by the University of Natural Resources. In 1967, he returned to his alma mater as full professor.

From 1949, he worked on commercialising his method with industry partners. From 1962, his company Feinmechanische Optische Gesellschaft developed and sold the relascope and other optical instruments with applications in forestry and the military.

With his wife Ilse, Bitterlich had four children. He died in his native Reutte on February 9, 2008, 10 days short of his centennial.

== Honours and awards ==
- Honorary citizen of Nashville, Tennessee
- Corresponding member of the Finnish Forest Research Institute
- Honorary Member of the Society of American Foresters (1971)
- Golden insignia of the Land of Salzburg
- Cross of Honour for Science and Art, 1st class (1983)
- Golden Medal of Reutte

A permanent exhibition at the Forest Discovery Centre in Füssen, Germany, shows a selection of his personal affects.
