= Jean-Baptiste Élie de Beaumont =

French geologist (1798–1874)

Léonce Élie de Beaumont
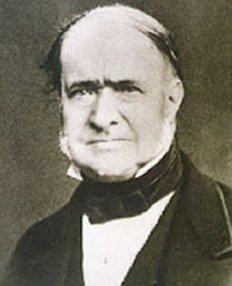
- Léonce Élie de Beaumont
- Born: Jean-Baptiste Armand Louis Léonce Élie de Beaumont; 25 September 1798; Canon, Calvados, France
- Died: 21 September 1874 (aged 75); Canon, Calvados, France
- Education: École des mines
- Awards: Wollaston Medal (1843)
- Scientific career
- Fields: geology

Jean-Baptiste Armand Louis Léonce Élie de Beaumont (25 September 1798 – 21 September 1874) was a French geologist. Among his ideas was that mountains were created in a series of episodes over geological time due to the cooling and shrinking of the earth. He also suggested that there was a pattern in the orientation of the mountain systems of the world which followed a system of five circles meeting at points on the earth that marked the points of a polyhedron.

== Biography ==
Élie de Beaumont was born in a family castle in Canon, in Calvados. He was educated at the Lycee Henri IV where he took the first prize in mathematics and physics at the École polytechnique, where he stood first at the exit examination in 1819; and at the École des mines (1819–1822), where he began to show a decided preference for the science with which his name is associated. In 1823 he was selected along with Dufrénoy by Brochant de Villiers, the professor of geology in the École des Mines, to accompany him on a scientific tour to England and Scotland, in order to inspect the mining and metallurgical establishments of the country, and to study the principles on which George Bellas Greenough's geological map of England (1820) had been prepared, with a view to the construction of a similar map of France.

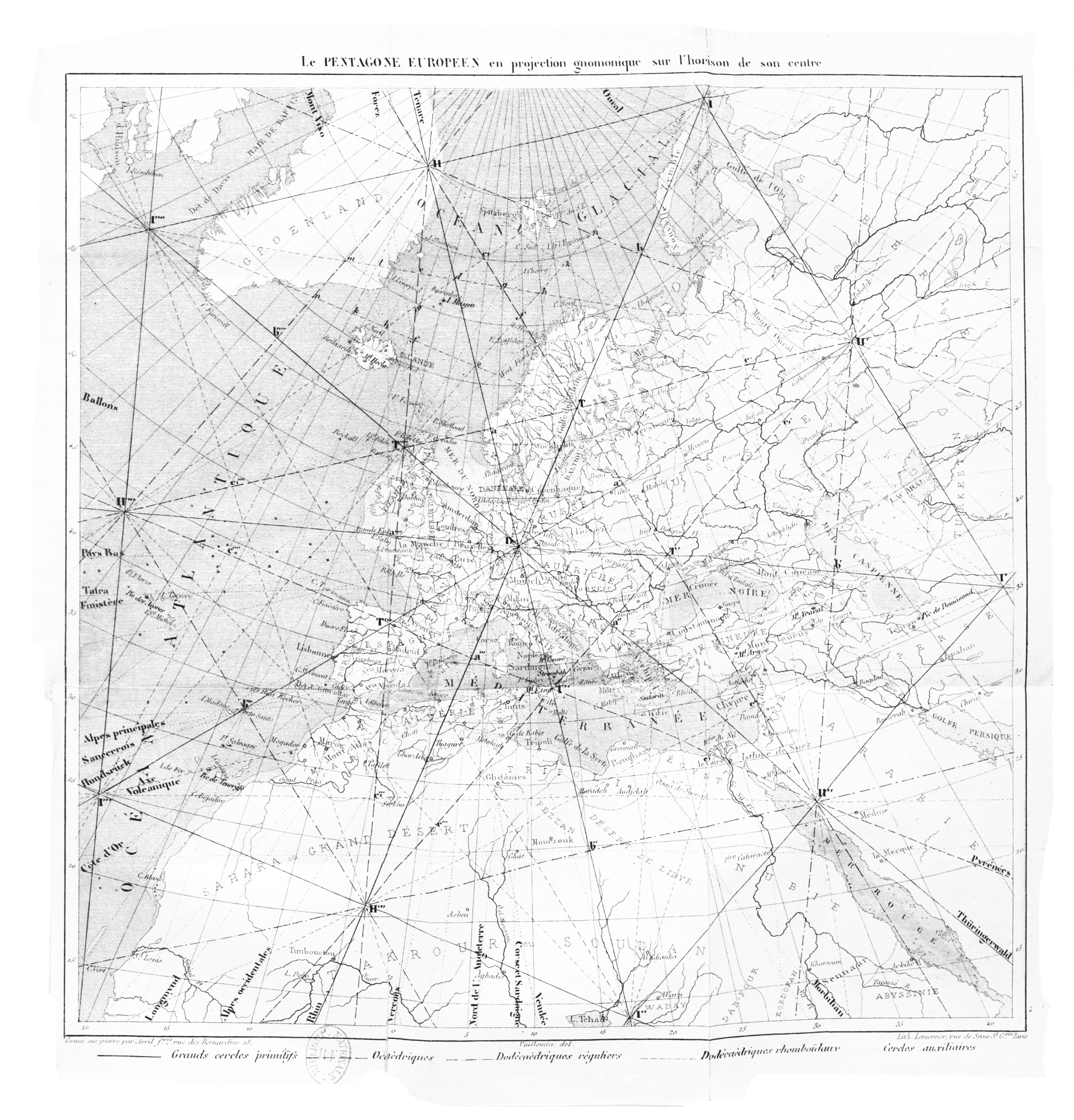
Élie de Beaumont's theory of pentagonal networks of mountain chains on the Earth

In 1832 he succeeded Georges Cuvier's chair of natural history at the Collège de France. In 1835 he was appointed professor of geology at the École des Mines, in succession to Brochant de Villiers, whose assistant he had been in the duties of the chair since 1827. He held the office of engineer-in-chief of mines in France from 1833 until 1847, when he was appointed inspector-general; and in 1861 he became vice-president of the Conseil-General des Mines and a grand officer of the Legion of Honour. His growing scientific reputation secured his election to the membership of the Academy of Berlin, of the French Academy of Sciences, of the Royal Society of Edinburgh (1845), of the Royal Society of London, as a foreign member of the Royal Swedish Academy of Sciences (1848), and as an international member of the American Philosophical Society (1860). By a decree of the president he was made a senator of France in 1852, and on the death of François Arago in 1853 he was chosen as perpetual secretary of the Academy of Sciences.

Élie de Beaumont's name is widely known to geologists in connection with his theory of the origin of mountain ranges, first propounded in a paper read to the Academy of Sciences in 1829, and afterwards elaborated in his Notice sur le système des montagnes (3 volumes, 1852). According to his view, all mountain ranges parallel to the same great circle of the earth are of strictly contemporaneous origin, and between the great circles a relation of symmetry exists in the form of a pentagonal réseau. An elaborate statement and criticism of the theory was given in his anniversary address to the Geological Society of London in 1853 by William Hopkins. The theory did not find general acceptance, but it proved of great value to geological science, owing to the extensive additions to the knowledge of the structure of mountain ranges which its author made in endeavouring to find facts to support it.

Mount Elie de Beaumont is in the Westland Tai Poutini National Park, on the west coast of New Zealand's the South Island and near the boundary with Aoraki / Mount Cook National Park. It is 3109m high.

Probably the best service Élie de Beaumont rendered to science, however, was in connection with the geological map of France, in the preparation of which he had the leading share. During this period Élie de Beaumont published many important memoirs on the geology of the country. After his retirement from the École des Mines he continued to superintend the issue of the detailed maps almost until his death, which occurred at Canon. His academic lectures for 1843-1844 were published in 2 volumes, (1845–1849), under the title Leçons de Géologie pratique.

The Beaumont crater on the Moon is named after him.
