= Hans Jørgen G. Gundersen =

Danish stereology researcher

Hans Jørgen Gottlieb Gundersen (2 May 1943 – 1 February 2021) was a Danish stereology researcher. He was employed as a professor at Aarhus University.

In January 2008 he received the August Krogh Prize "for his ground-breaking research in stereology for the spatial description and understanding of biological tissue". He was also a recipient of The Novo Nordisk Prize.
