= GGB =

GGB may refer to:

- Gerdau, a Brazilian steel company
- GGB Bearing Technology, a global plain bearings manufacturer
- Golden Gate Bridge, a suspension bridge in San Francisco, CA
- Gornergrat railway (German: Gornergratbahn), in Switzerland
- Governor-General of the Bahamas
- Governor-General of Barbados
- Governor-General of Belize
- Green Garter Band, of the University of Oregon
- Grupo Gay da Bahia, a gay rights organization in Brazil
- GeoGebra
- Gabriel George Brown
