= Paris Air Show =

Air show and aerospace-industry exhibition event

Paris Air Show Salon international de l'aéronautique et de l'espace, Paris-Le Bourget

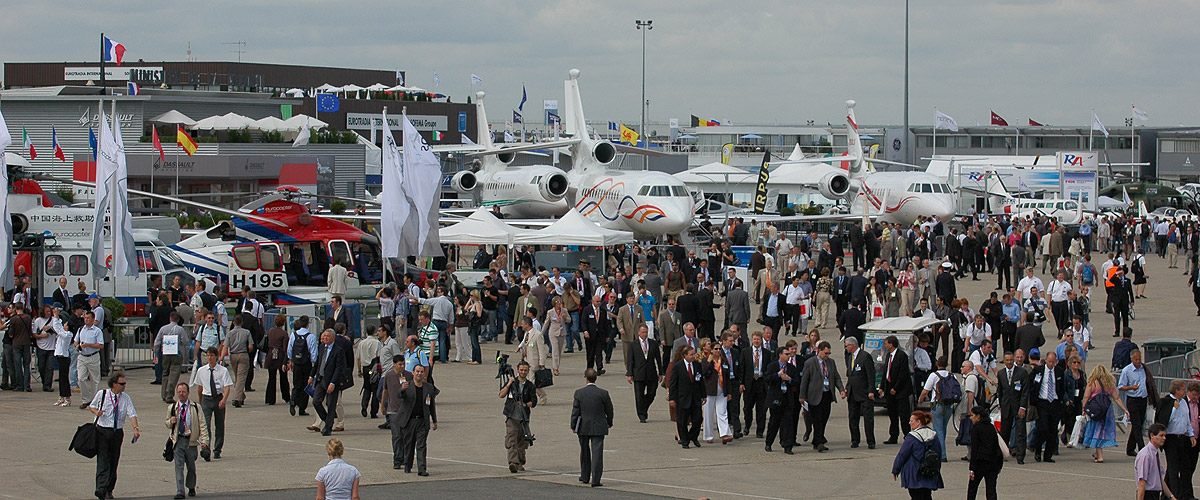
- The first day of the 2007 Paris Air Show
- Status: Active
- Genre: Commercial air show
- Dates: June
- Frequency: biennial: Odd years
- Venue: Paris–Le Bourget Airport
- Locations: Le Bourget, Paris (since 1953)
- Coordinates: 48.9555°N 2.4324°E
- Country: France
- Established: 1909; 117 years ago
- Most recent: 2025
- Next event: 2027
- Attendance: 2017: 322000
- Major events: Aerobatic displays Static displays
- Organizer: SIAE (GIFAS)
- Website: www.siae.fr/en/

The Paris Air Show (French: Salon international de l'aéronautique et de l'espace de Paris-Le Bourget, Salon du Bourget) is a air show and aerospace industry trade fair held since 1909 in Paris, France. Organized by the French aerospace industry's primary representative body, the Groupement des industries françaises aéronautiques et spatiales (GIFAS), it is the largest event of its type in the world, measured by number of exhibitors and size of exhibit space, followed by UK's Farnborough Air Show, Dubai Air Show, and Singapore Airshow. It currently takes place at Paris–Le Bourget Airport on odd years, alternating with the Eurosatory military industry exhibition.

The event displays military and civilian aircraft, and is attended by many military forces and the major aircraft manufacturers, often announcing major aircraft sales. It starts with four professional days and is then opened to the general public followed from Friday to Sunday. The format is similar to Farnborough and the ILA Berlin Air Show, both staged in even years.

The 53rd Air Show attracted 2,453 exhibitors from 49 countries and occupied more than 125,000 square meters. Organizers canceled the 2021 show due to the COVID pandemic. It resumed in 2023.

== History ==
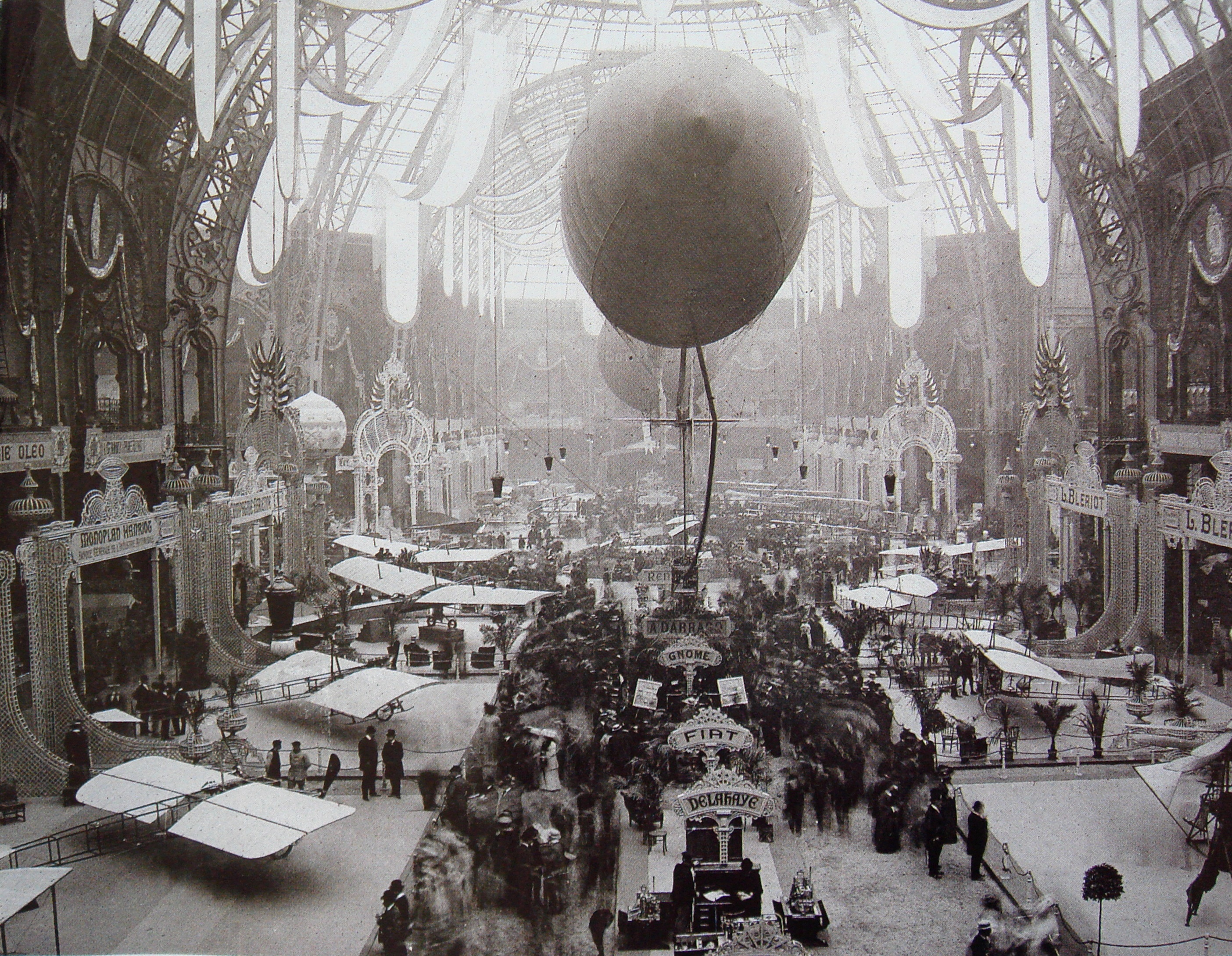
The first Salon de la locomotion aérienne, 1909, Grand Palais, Paris

The Paris Air Show traces its history to 1908, when a section of the Paris Motor Show was dedicated to aircraft. The following year, a dedicated air show was held at the Grand Palais from 25 September to 17 October, during which 100,000 visitors turned out to see products and innovations from 380 exhibitors. There were four further shows before the First World War. The show restarted in 1919, and from 1924 it was held every two years before being interrupted again by the Second World War. It restarted in 1946 and since 1949, has been held in every odd year.

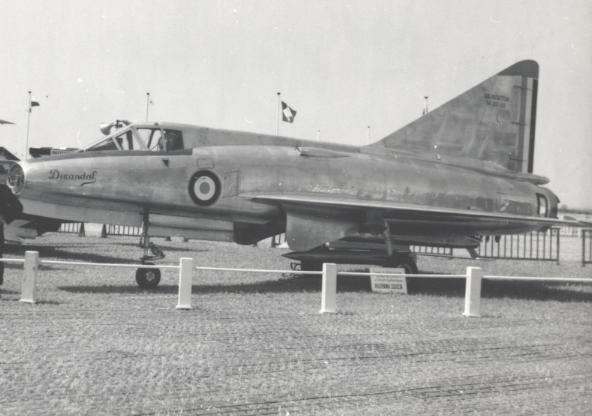
SNCASE SE.212 Durandal experimental jet/rocket fighter aircraft at the 1957 Air Salon

The air show continued to be held at the Grand Palais, and from 1949 flying demonstrations were staged at Paris Orly Airport. In 1953, the show was relocated from the Grand Palais to Le Bourget. The show was drawing international notice in the 1960s. Since the 1970s, the show has emerged as the main international reference of the aeronautical sector.

=== 1967 ===
The 1967 air show was opened by French President Charles de Gaulle, who toured the exhibits and shook hands with two Soviet cosmonauts and two American astronauts. Prominently displayed by the Soviet Union was a three-stage Vostok rocket, such as the one that had carried Yuri Gagarin into space on April 12, 1961. The "extraordinarily powerful" Vostok was downplayed by American missile experts as "rather old and unsophisticated." The American exhibit, the largest at the fair, featured the F-111 swing-wing fighter bomber, a replica of Charles Lindbergh's Spirit of St. Louis. and the Ling-Temco-Vought XC-142A, a cargo plane capable of a vertical takeoff and landing. A full-size model of the supersonic Concorde was displayed by the French and British, auguring its successful first flight on March 2, 1969.

=== 1969 ===
"The largest plane in the world," the Boeing 747 jet airliner, arrived on June 3, after flying non-stop from Seattle, Washington, and the Apollo 8 command module, charred by its re-entry, was there flanked by the Apollo 9 astronauts, but the most-viewed exhibit was the supersonic Concorde, which made its first flight over Paris as the show opened.

=== 1971 ===
The Soviet Tu-144 supersonic airliner was flown to Le Bourget for the 1971 show, drawing comparisons with the French Concorde. Landing with the Concorde was the world's largest aircraft, the American Lockheed C-5A Galaxy.

=== 1973 ===
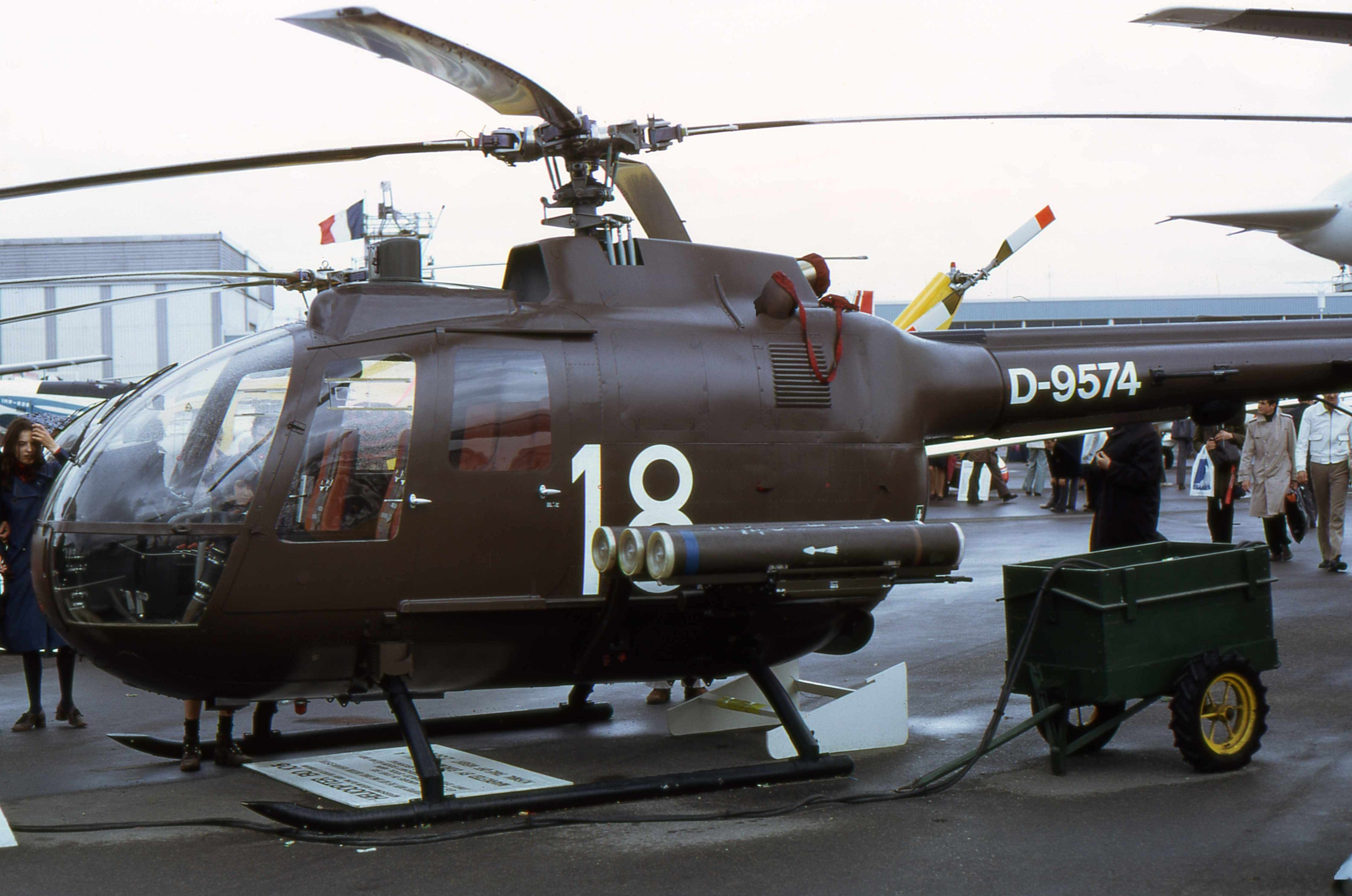
Bo 105C at the 1973 Paris Air Show

The crash of the Soviet Tu-144, see below, overshadowed the 1973 show, otherwise characterized by "There was nothing new."

=== 1975 ===
One hundred and eighty-two aircraft were scheduled for appearance. Despite restrictions that followed the TU-144 crash in 1973, a day of flying pleased viewers. In particular, the American YF-16 and the French Mirage F-1E competed in turn before a critical audience. Days later, Belgium became the fourth European nation to choose the YF-16 over the F-1E.

=== 1977 ===
Celebration of Charles Lindbergh's trans-Atlantic flight to Le Bourget fifty years ago recalled that historic event. Anne Morrow Lindbergh, Lindbergh's widow, attended the ceremony along with early trans-Atlantic pilots, Maurice Bellonte and Armand Lotti. Recent extension of coastal limits to 200 nautical miles has produced new maritime-reconnaissance (MR) aircraft. The crash of a Fairchild A-10 tank-destroyer led to tightened rules on air show demonstrations.

=== 1979 ===
Two airliners, the Airbus A310 and the Boeing 767, are competing for the international market, but neither will carry passengers before 1982. The Westland WG30 transport helicopter shows promise. "The Mirage 4000 remains a question mark" despite being "surely the main highlight this year at Le Bourget."

=== 1981 ===
Exhibiting at the show, Airbus, Boeing, and McDonnell Douglas/Fokker vie for the 150-seat airline market, while Rolls-Royce/Japan, General Electric/Snecma (CFM), and Pratt & Whitney contest for their engines. The Northrop F-5G Tigershark mockup was on display and expected to fly in 1982 with delivery the following year. A novelty was Air Transat, a light aircraft trans-Atlantic race from Le Bourget to Sikorsky Memorial Airport in Bridgeport, Connecticut, and back, won by a twin engine Piper Navaho and a Beechcraft Bonanza.

=== 1983 ===
The American Space Shuttle Enterprise was flown around Paris and towered over other exhibits, but "much more intriguing" were replicas of two twin-engined fighters, the British Aerospace ACA and French Dassault Breguet ACX. Sales of Boeing 757 and Airbus A310 airliners to Singapore Airlines were welcome news during an ongoing recession.

=== 1985 ===
The Soviet Antonov An-124 Ruslan military heavy lifter was the largest exhibit in 1985. Propfan engines stirred interest. Reflecting the upturn in the economy, Boeing and Airbus announced new contracts totaling as much as $1,700 million. The Hubble Space Telescope should be deployed in 1986.

=== 1987 ===
Newly introduced, in the rain, were the Soviet Mil Mi-34 Helicopter, the Israeli Super Phantom, and the Harrier GR.5. Airbus announced firm orders for both the A330 and A340 airliners. Exhibiting at the show for the first time, the Chinese displayed, among others, the A-5C Attacker (Fantan) and FT-7. Richard Rutan and Jeana Yeager, who flew a Voyager non-stop around the world without refueling, were present, but their aircraft was not.

=== 1989 ===
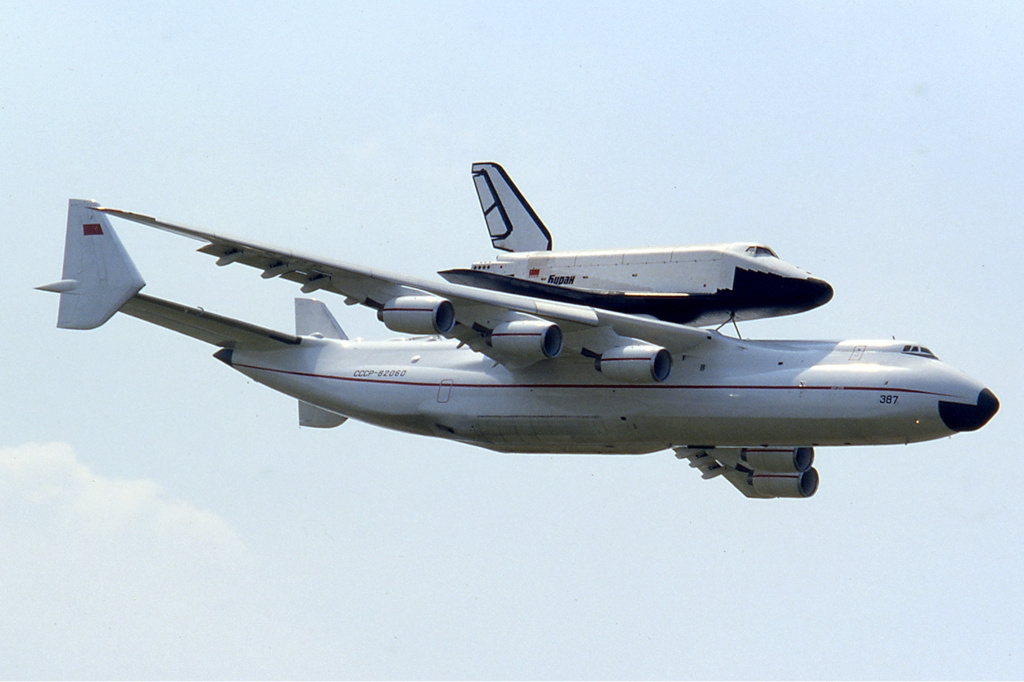
Antonov An-225 Mriya with Buran at Le Bourget, 1989

The "38th Paris International Air and Space Show" or "1989 Paris Air Show" featured a variety of aerospace technology from NATO and Warsaw Pact nations. A Mikoyan MiG-29 crashed during a demonstration flight with no loss of life. The then-Soviet space shuttle Buran and its carrier, Antonov An-225 Mriya, was displayed at this show. A Sukhoi Su-27 made debut to western world, as well first publicly seen "Cobra" maneuver.

=== 1991 ===
Despite a Department of Defense display of the F-117A Stealth Fighter and other Gulf War armaments, most American contractors stayed home, so Soviet aircraft drew attention, among them the Beriev Be-42 Mermaid (A-40 Albatros) amphibian, the MiG-31 Foxhound interceptor, and the Yak-141 short take-off/vertical landing (ASTOVL) supersonic fighter. When it receives its first customer order, Dassault plans to begin production of the Mirage 2000-5, which is a "new machine compared to the basic Mirage 2000."

=== 1993 ===
The show attracted 1,611 exhibitors from 39 countries and nearly 300,000 visitors attended the show. Dassault featured the debut of the Falcon 2000, and Airbus will manufacture the 130-seat A319.

=== 1995 ===
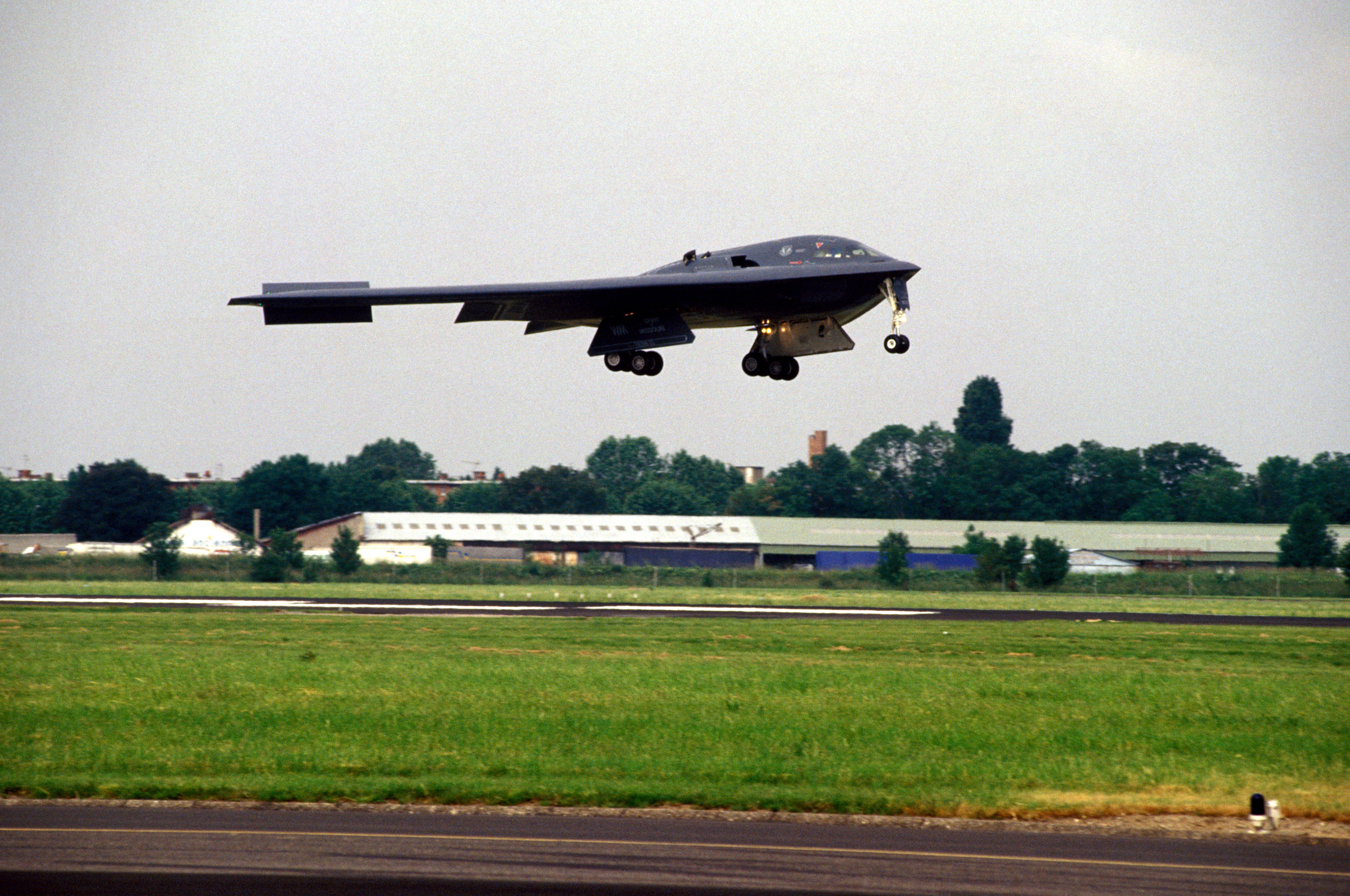
A stealth B-2 Spirit in 1995

The 41st Paris Air Show main attraction was the stealth B-2 Spirit bomber, along with the Tupolev Tu-160 and Sukhoi Su-34 bombers. The flying display included the Bell-Boeing V-22 tilt-rotor, the Airbus Beluga Super Transporter, the Eurofighter 2000, the Rockwell-MBB X-31 high-manoeuvrability fighter demonstrator, the McDonnell Douglas C-17 military transport, the Eurocopter EC135 civil helicopter, the Sukhoi Su-35 fighter, and the Daimler-Benz Aerospace Dornier 328-100, and for the first time on static the Boeing 777, Saab Gripen, Atlas Cheetah Mirage and Cessna Citation X.

=== 1997 ===
American Eagle announced purchase of forty-two EMB-145 regional jets from Embraer and twenty-five Bombardier CRJ700 airliners from Bombardier. Spectators saw two Eurofighter Typhoon EF2000s flying together. A full-scale mock-up of the Bell Boeing 609 civil tilt-rotor aircraft attracted attention. IAR Brasov featured a prototype Anti-Tank Optronic Search and Combat System (SOCAT) helicopter, an upgrade of the IAR-330 Puma.

=== 1999 ===
The 1999 show continued a trend away from displays of new aircraft toward announcements of new contracts. Although new entries such as the Fairchild 30-seat 328JET and the Boeing 100-seat 717-200 attracted interest, airlines ordered as many as 103 Embraer ERJ-135s and 145s in addition to a 4.9 billion-dollar order for ERJ-170s and ERJ-190-200s. In February, the Russian Il-103 received US Federal Aviation Administration (FAA) approval, a breakthrough in certifying Russian aircraft for the American market. Subsequent certification for the Ilyushin Il-96T wide-bodied jet was displayed at the show.

=== 2001 ===
Boeing introduced scale models of their Sonic Cruiser which would reach speeds approaching Mach 0.98, together with a walk-through hologram. The Airbus A380, seating 555, offered size rather than speed, and was there on the tarmac. Crowds toured the restored Antonov An-225 Dream, the world's largest aircraft. Dassault featured a model of the new Falcon FNX business jet that has a projected range of 10,500 kilometers at Mach 0.88. The Joint Strike Fighter (JSF), which is undergoing STOVL testing, is a likely replacement for older American F-15E Strike Eagles and F-117 Nighthawks.

=== 2003 ===
The Concorde F-BTSD made its farewell landing at Le Bourget on June 14, the opening day, and the Dassault's Mirage 2000 and Rafale put on a show overhead. Pilotless planes, such as the Northrop Grumman RQ-4 Global Hawk and General Atomics Predator drew attention. Boeing publicized the 7E7 Dreamliner.

=== 2005 ===
FlightGlobal cited the Airbus A380 and "nineteen remarkable first appearances," including Dassault's Falcon 7X and Gulfstream's G550 business jets, Embraer's EMB-195 regional jet, and the second prototype of Alenia Aermacchi's M-346 advanced jet trainer. CompositesWorld added the Boeing 777-200LR and the Dassault UCAV Neuron.

=== 2007 ===
The Boeing 787 Dreamliner sold briskly, as did the Airbus A380 and A350 XWB. A mockup of the Lockheed Martin Joint Strike Fighter was on display. The IAI Heron TP UAV is ready to enter production. The Spanish steer-by-leaning AN-1 AeroQuad flying platform from Aeris Naviter weighed only 100 kilograms.

=== 2009 ===
The 48th International Paris Air Show took place in 2009 and marked a hundred years of technological innovation in aeronautics and space conquest. The event was held from 15 to 21 June, at Le Bourget. A memorial service was held for the victims of Air France Flight 447.

=== 2011 ===
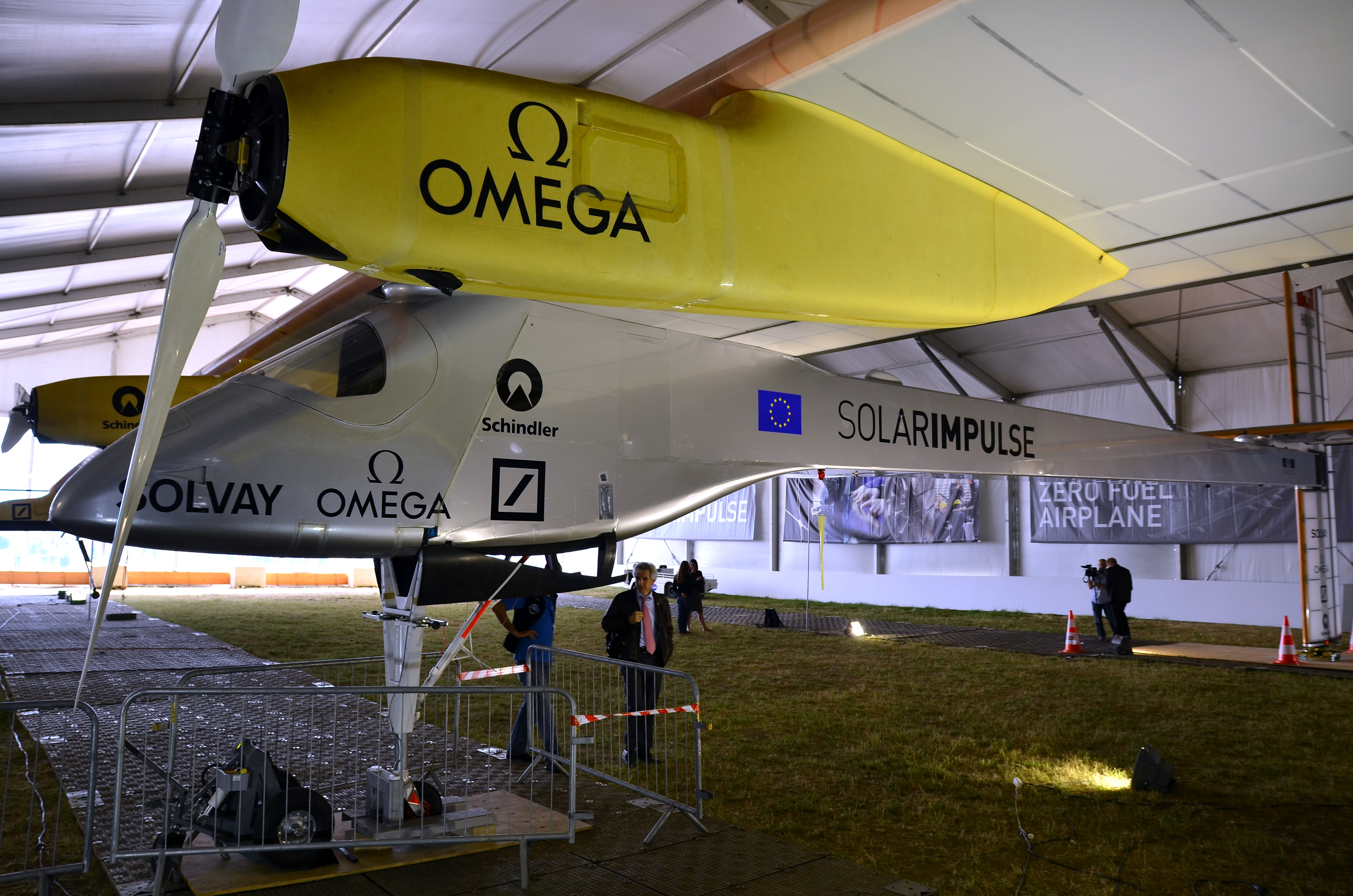
Solar Impulse at Le Bourget 2011

The 2011 show was the 49th presentation, and hosted over 2,100 international exhibitors in 28 international pavilions. A total of 150 aircraft were on display, including the solar-electric aircraft Solar Impulse.

A demo A380 was damaged the day before the exhibition opened and needed a replacement; while the new Airbus A400M Atlas military transport aircraft had an engine failure, but could still perform some demonstration flights.

=== 2013 ===
American fighter jets were not on display for the first time in more than two decades due to budget cuts.

=== 2015 ===
The 2015 show, held from June 15 to June 21, 2015, saw the new Dassault Falcon 8X, Airbus A350 XWB and Bombardier CS300 and received 351,584 visitors, 2,303 exhibitors over 122,500 square metres of exhibition space, 4,359 journalists from 72 countries and 130 billion euros in purchases and "cemented its position as the world's largest event dedicated to the aerospace industry". During the show, Airbus Helicopters announced a successor to the Super Puma, called the Airbus Helicopters X6.

=== 2017 ===
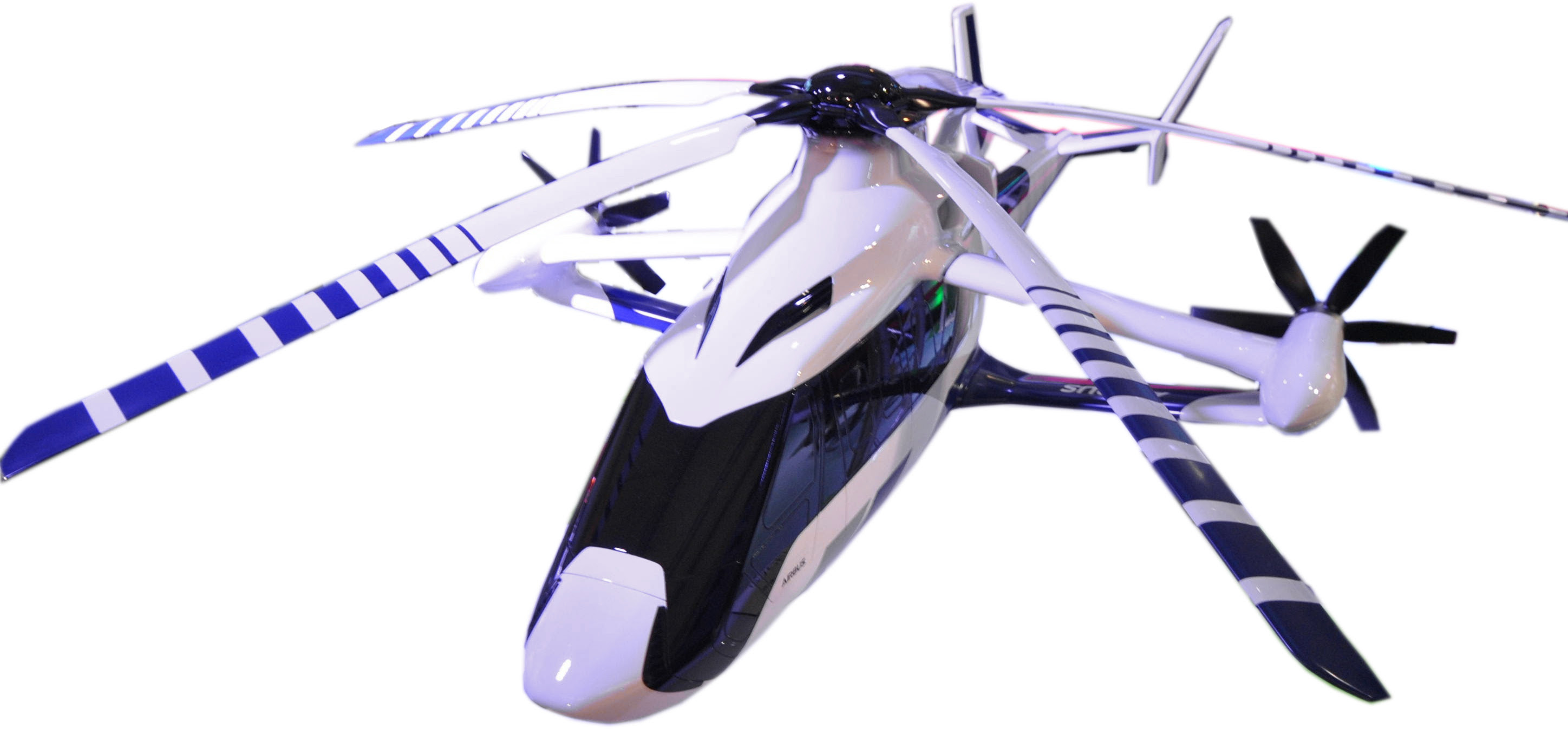
Airbus Helicopters X3-derived RACER model, 2017

The 52nd Air Show was held from 19 to 25 June 2017, with 2,381 exhibitors from 48 countries, showing 140 aircraft including for the first time the Airbus A321neo, Airbus A350-1000, Boeing 787-10, Boeing 737 MAX 9, Kawasaki P-1, Mitsubishi MRJ90 and Lockheed Martin F-35. Inaugurated by French President Emmanuel Macron, it was visited by 290 official delegations from 98 countries and 7 international organizations, French Prime Minister Édouard Philippe, 3,450 journalists, 142,000 trade visitors and 180,000 general public visitors. Announcements for 934 commercial aircraft orders and purchasing commitments were worth a catalogue value of US$115 billion.

There were 1,226 order and commitments: 352 firm orders, 699 letters of intent or memorandums of understanding, 40 options and 135 options letters of intent; plus 229 conversions of existing orders, mainly for the Boeing 737-10 MAX variant launched at the show. There were mainly narrowbodies with 1,021 orders or commitments against 76 widebodies, 48 regional jets and 81 turboprop airliners. With 766, mainly preliminary deals, Boeing led Airbus with 331, while Bombardier Aerospace had 64, Embraer 48 and ATR Aircraft 17. Nearly half of those order and commitments was from aircraft lessors with 513, and where the operator was known, 43% came from Asia-Pacific, 27% from the middle east, 10% from Europe as from South America, 7% from Africa and 3% from North America.

=== 2019 ===
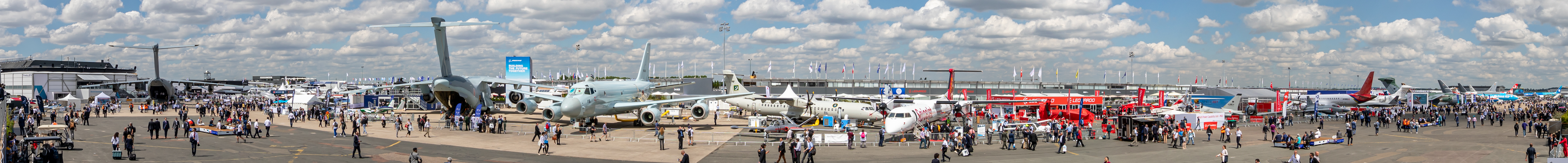
Paris air show 2019

The 53rd Air Show was held from 17 to 23 June 2019 with 2,453 exhibitors from 49 countries over 125,000 m^{2} (1,350,000 sq ft) of exhibition space for 140 aircraft shown including the recently certified Airbus A330neo and Boeing KC-46, Bombardier Global 7500, Embraer Praetor 600 and soon to be certified Cessna Citation Latitude; it saw 316,470 unique visitors (for more than 500,000 entries): 139,840 professional from 185 countries and 176,630 from the general Public plus 2,700 journalists from 87 countries and announcements for $140 billion worth of orders. The air show ended with 866 aircraft commitments totalling $60.9 billion (130 firm orders, 562 LoI/MoU, 119 options and 55 options on LoIs): 388 for Airbus including 243 newly launched A321XLRs and 85 A220s, 232 for Boeing including 200 737 MAXes for IAG, 145 for ATR and 78 for Embraer; 558 narrowbodies, 62 widebodies, 93 regional jets and 153 turboprops.

=== 2021 ===
Due to the Impact of the COVID-19 pandemic, the June 2021 Paris Air Show was cancelled.

=== 2023 ===
The air show returns for the first time after the COVID-19 pandemic on 19-25 of June 2023. The first four days are open only to aviation industry followed by three days that include the general public admission.

=== 2025 ===
The show was held between 16 and 22 June, 2025, with the professional days running from 16 to 19 June. After the crash of Air India Flight 171, Boeing CEO Kelly Ortberg cancelled his plans for attending the event.

== Accidents ==
=== 1961 ===
A Convair B-58 Hustler crashed while performing low-altitude aerobatics. The aircraft reportedly flew into a cloud bank, where visual reference was lost, and crashed, killing 3 on board.

=== 1965 ===
Another Convair B-58 crashed while on final approach during an overweight landing. The aircraft touched down short of the runway, killing United States Air Force Lt. Colonel Charles D. Tubbs. Two other crewmen were injured.

=== 1969 ===
A Fairchild-Hiller FH-1100 helicopter crashed killing the pilot. Witnesses reported seeing "something wrong with the main rotor".

=== 1973 ===
On June 3, 1973, the second Tupolev Tu-144 production aircraft (registration CCCP-77102) crashed during its display. It stalled while attempting a rapid climb. Trying to pull out of the subsequent dive, the aircraft broke up and crashed, destroying 15 houses and killing all six on board and eight on the ground; a further sixty people received serious injuries.

The cause of this accident remains controversial. Theories as to why the accident occurred include that the Tu-144 climbed to avoid a French Mirage chase plane whose pilot was attempting to photograph it; that changes had been made by the ground engineering team to the auto-stabilisation circuits to allow the Tu-144 to outperform the Concorde in the display circuit; and that the crew were attempting a manoeuvre to outshine the Concorde.

=== 1977 ===
An A-10 Thunderbolt II crashed, killing the pilot.

=== 1989 ===
A Mikoyan MiG-29 crashed during a demonstration flight with no loss of life.

=== 1999 ===
A Sukhoi Su-30 crashed during a demonstration flight with no loss of life.

== See also ==
- Aero India
- EAA AirVenture Oshkosh
- Farnborough International Airshow
- ILA Berlin Air Show
