= GIFAS =

Groupement des industries françaises aéronautiques et spatiales
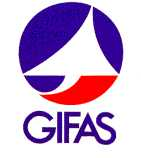
- Company type: Trade Association
- Industry: Aerospace
- Founded: 1908
- Headquarters: Paris
- Area served: France
- Key people: Guillaume Faury (President)
- Website: gifas.asso.fr

The Groupement des industries françaises aéronautiques et spatiales (abbreviated GIFAS) is the French Aerospace Industries Association created in 1908, featuring more than 420 members. The first name of the association was Association des Industries de la Locomotion Aérienne. It acquired its current name in 1975.

The current president of the GIFAS is Guillaume Faury, Airbus CEO.

== Organization ==
Some members are:

- Airbus
- Astrium
- Dassault Aviation
- GGB Bearing Technology
- Goodrich Corporation
- Groupe Latécoère
- MBDA
- Ratier
- Safran
- Snecma
- SOCATA
- Socomore
- Thales Group
- Zodiac Aerospace
- SPI

== See also ==
- Aerospace Industries Association
