= ILA Berlin Air Show =

German aeorspace industry exhibition

Coordinates: 52.35163°N 13.47304°E

ILA Berlin Air Show Internationale Luft- und Raumfahrtausstellung
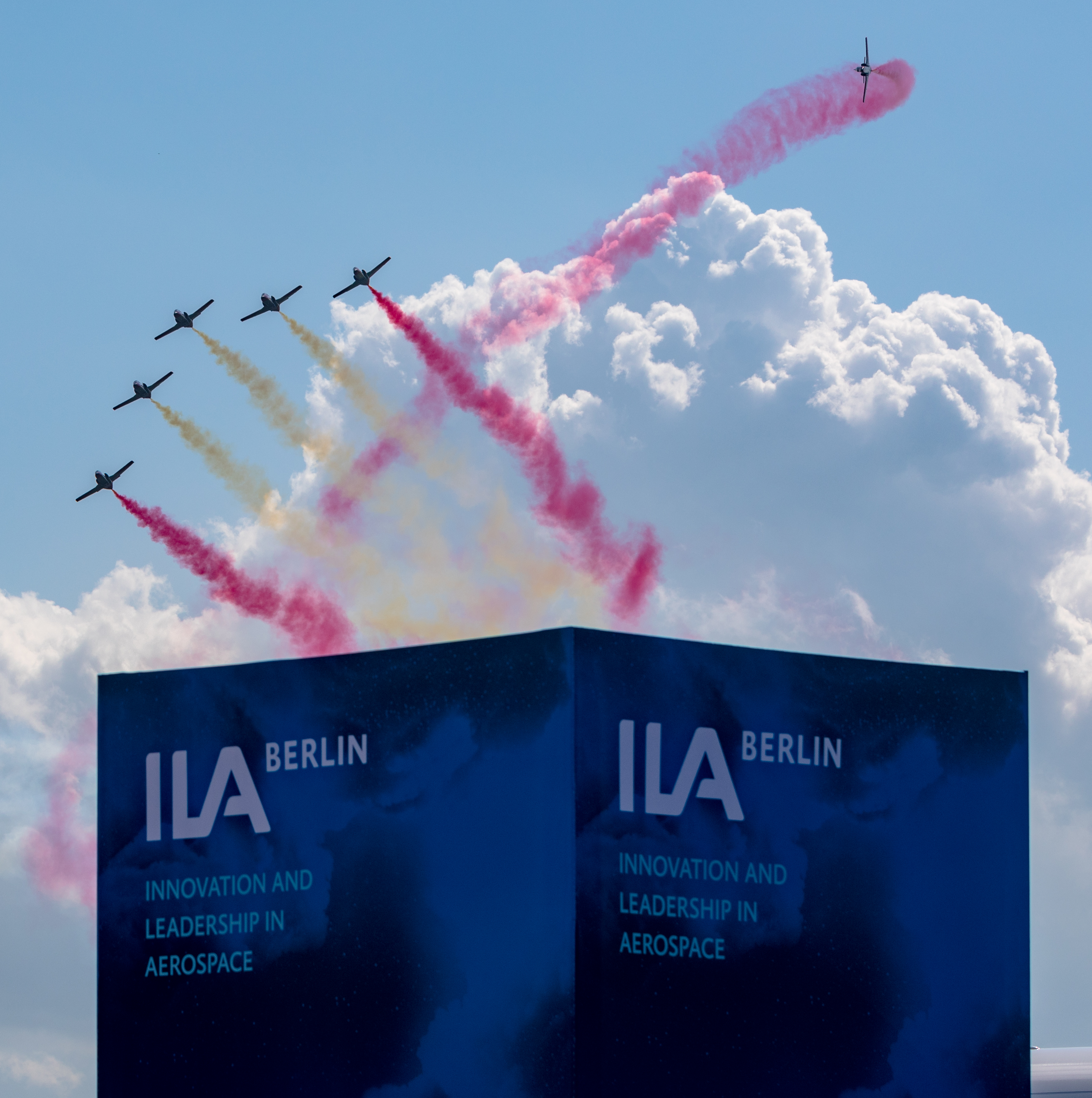
- Aerobatics show of Patrulla Águila at the ILA 2018
- Genre: Air show
- Dates: June
- Frequency: Biennial: Even years
- Venue: Berlin Brandenburg Airport (BER) in 2012
- Location: Berlin
- Country: Germany
- Established: 1909
- Most recent: 2026
- Next event: 2028
- Attendance: 230,000 (2012)
- Organizer: German Aerospace Industries Association & Messe Berlin GmbH
- Website: ILA Berlin Air Show

The ILA Berlin Air Show (German: Internationale Luft- und Raumfahrtausstellung (ILA)) combines a major trade exhibition for the aerospace and defence industries with a public airshow. It is held every even year at the new Berlin ExpoCenter Airport next to Berlin Brandenburg Airport in Schönefeld, Brandenburg 18 km southeast of Berlin, Germany. The most recent ILA Berlin Air Show was held in June 2026.

Established in 1909, it claims to be world's oldest air show, and it is among the largest and most important aerospace trade fairs today. According to the organisers Messe Berlin GmbH, in 2012 the Berlin Air Show attracted 125,000 professional visitors and 105,000 members of the general public, with 3,600 journalists from 65 countries also attending.

The format is similar to the Paris Air Show in France and the Farnborough International Airshow in Britain, the other major events in the European air show calendar. The Berlin event starts with two professional days closed to the general public, and then on Friday, Saturday and Sunday the public are allowed in.

The main display sections in 2022 included commercial air transport, space, military aviation, helicopters and both civil and military unmanned aircraft systems, also known as UAVs.

== History ==
It was first held in Frankfurt am Main in 1909, and as such can lay claim to being the oldest aviation show in the world. After the first ILA, following the idea of the aircraft constructor August Euler, numerous flying clubs combined to form the German Pilots' Association in April 1910. Shortly after, the Association of German Aircraft Makers was founded in Frankfurt/Main, establishing close ties between the ILA and the future Federal Association of the Aerospace Industry (BDLI), an organisation that exists today.

Before the First World War, the ILA was held in Berlin (1912 and later on in 1928). When Germany regained air sovereignty after the Second World War, the foundations were laid in 1955 for an "International Show for Travel by Air", which in 1957 took place at Langenhagen Airport as part of the Hanover Trade Fair, the first in a run of ILA shows in Hanover that was to last over 30 years.

Known initially as the German Aviation Show, the fair was increasingly attracting participants from abroad, and in 1978 the symbolic three letters ILA from 1909 were revived. In 1992, the far-reaching political and economic changes which had taken place in Europe since the fall of the Berlin Wall opened the way for the ILA to return to Berlin. The ILA's main display sections include commercial aviation, aerospace, military aviation and military technology, equipment and engines, and general aviation and helicopters.

== Location ==
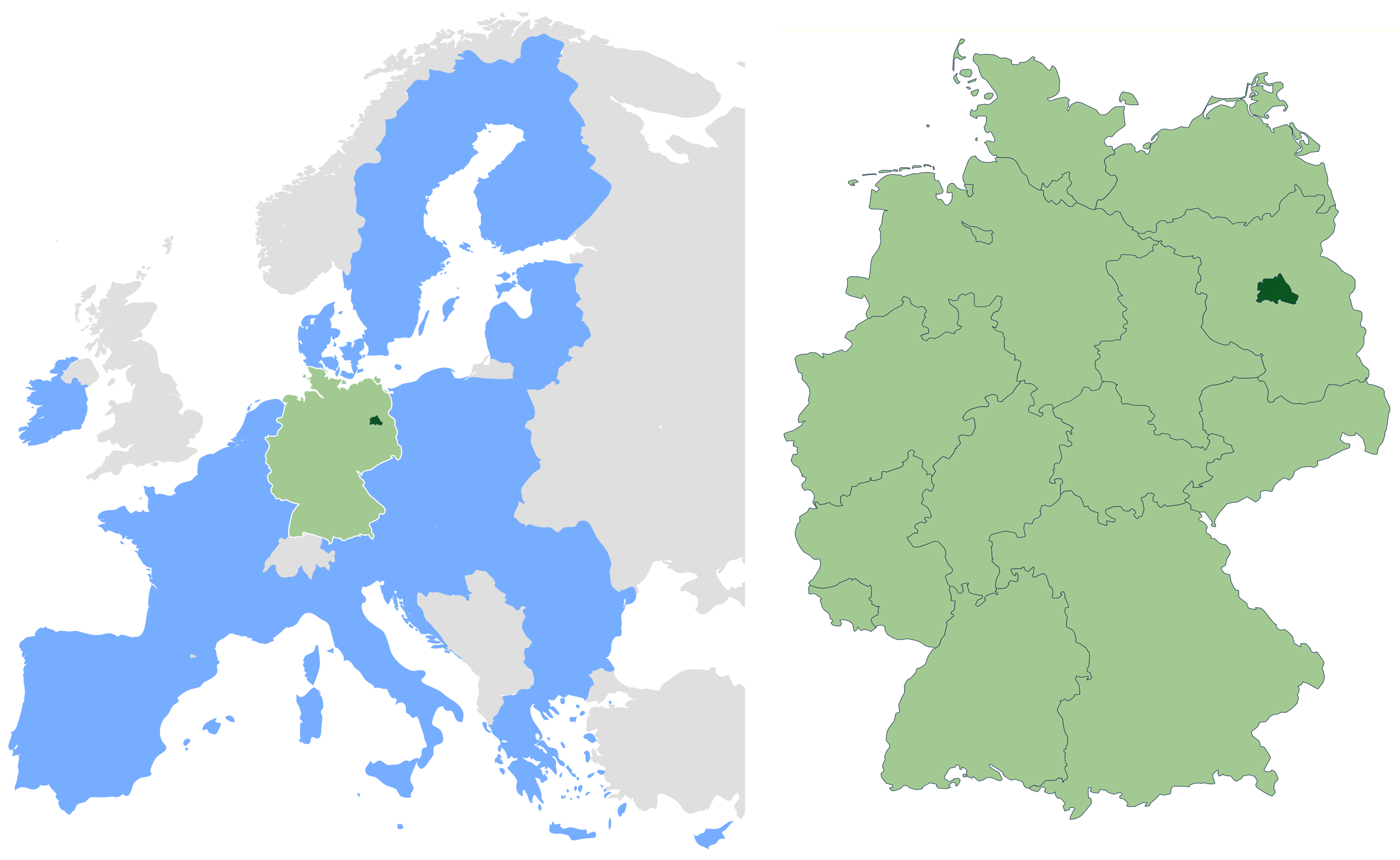
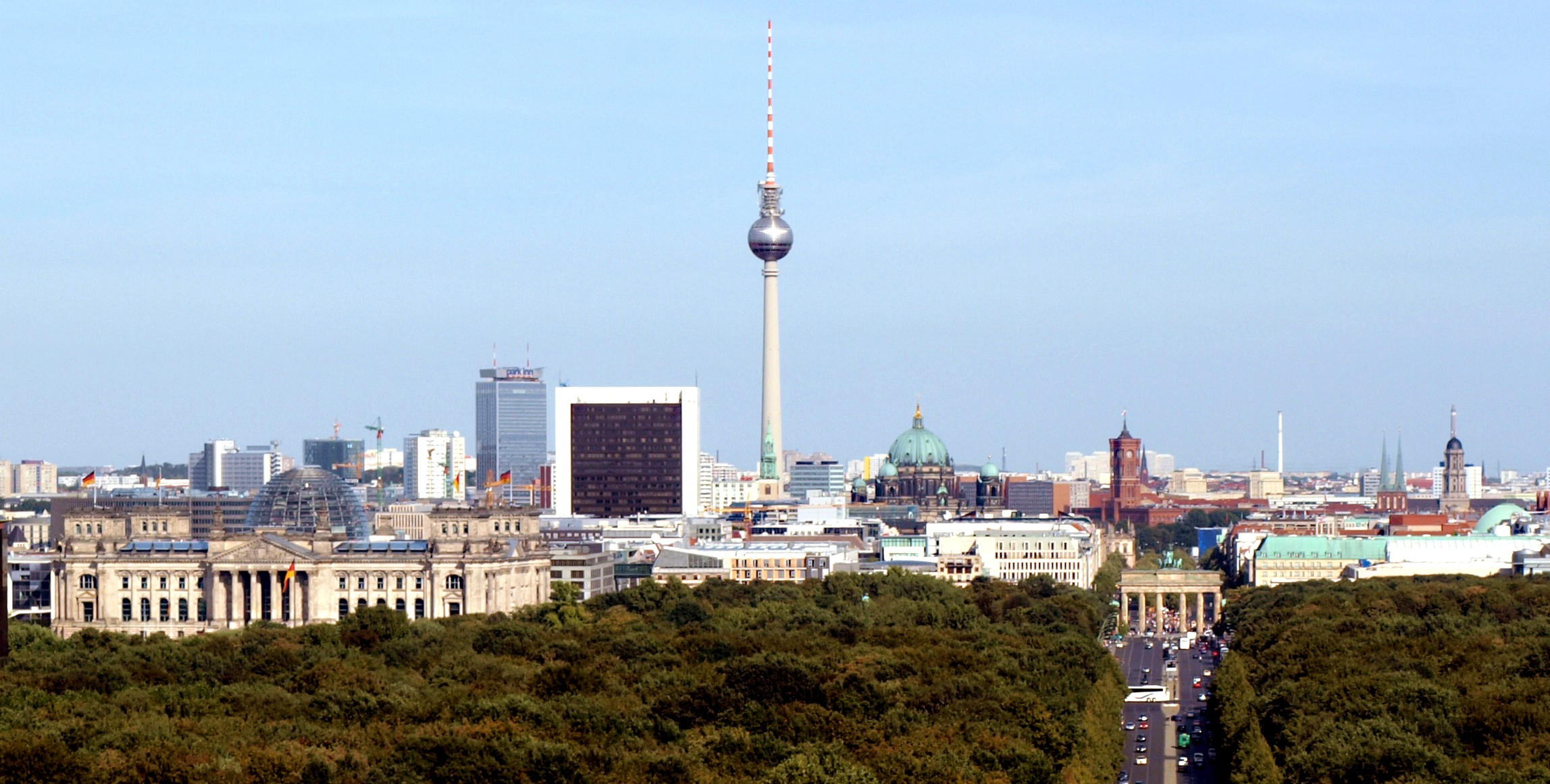
Berlin in Germany and Europe (left) and the city's inner district (right)

The new multi-purpose exhibition area, called Berlin ExpoCenter Airport adjacent to Berlin Brandenburg Airport (BER) was finished in time for ILA 2012. The main section of the grounds cover approximately 250,000 square metres.

The site is situated 18 km (11 mi) southeast of Germany's capital city Berlin.

== ILA 2002 ==
ILA exhibitions
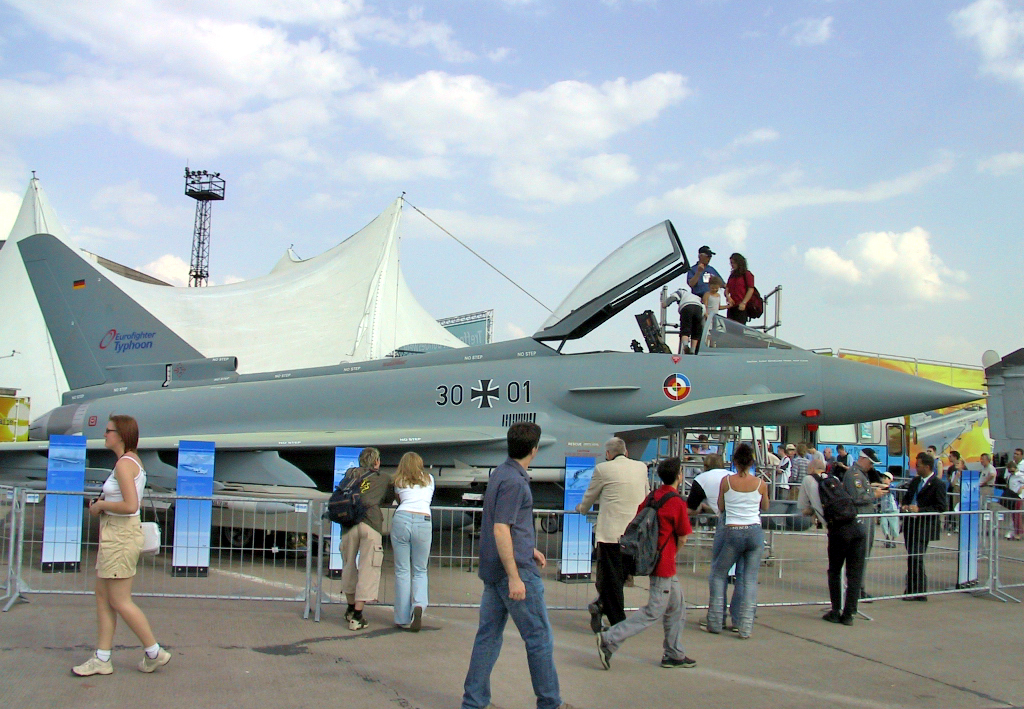
Eurofighter Typhoon

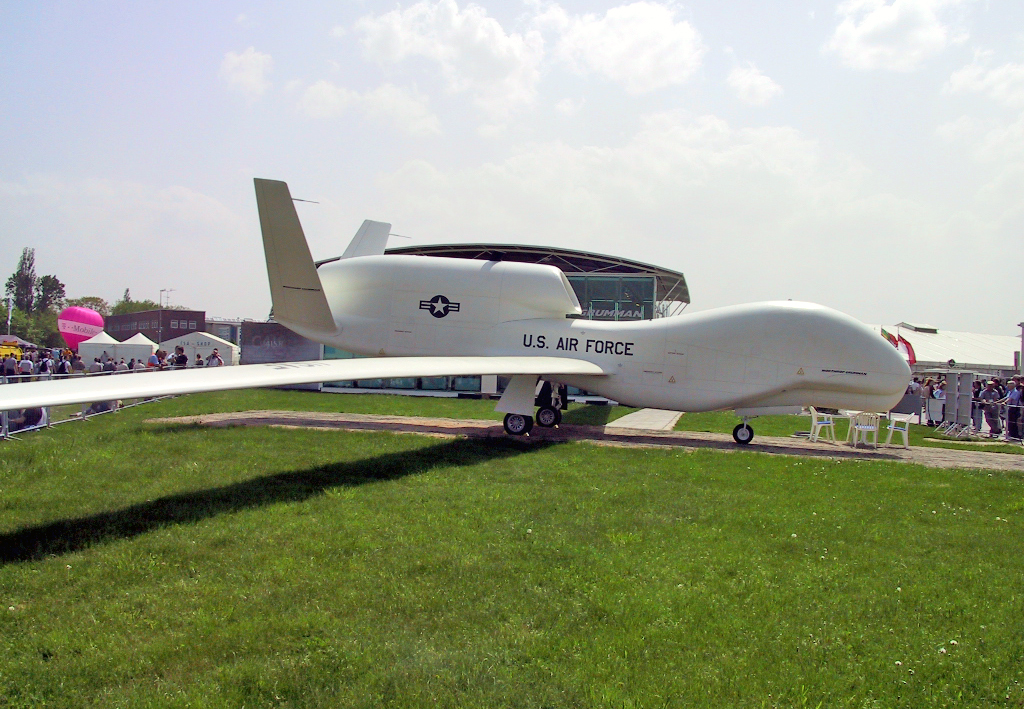
RQ-4 Global Hawk

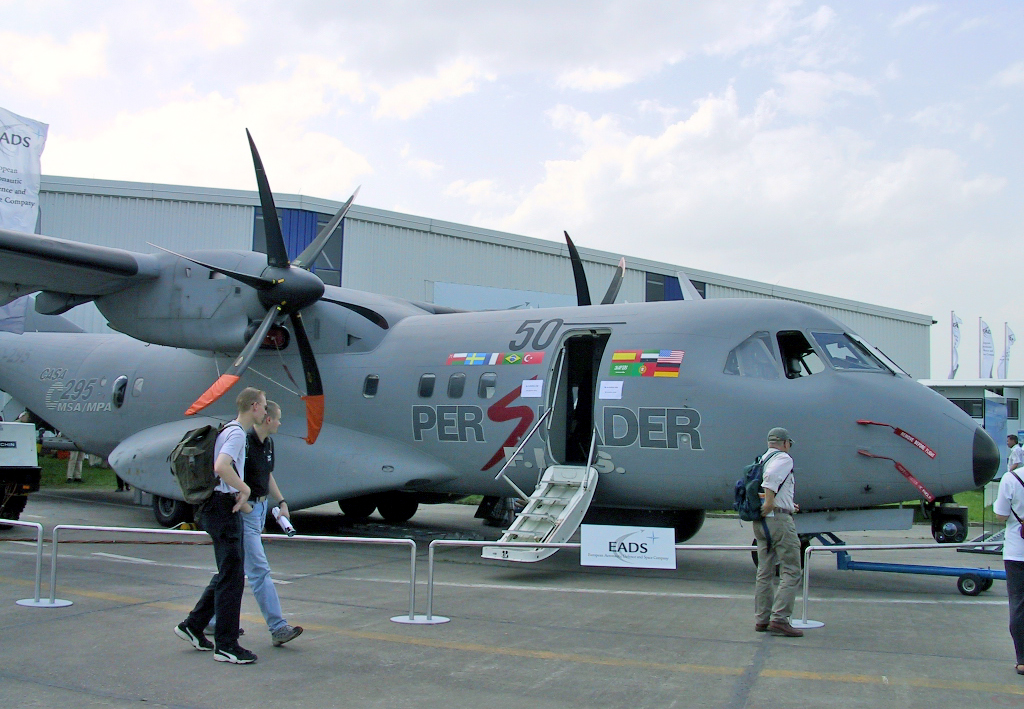
CASA C-295 Persuader

== ILA 2004 ==
ILA exhibitions
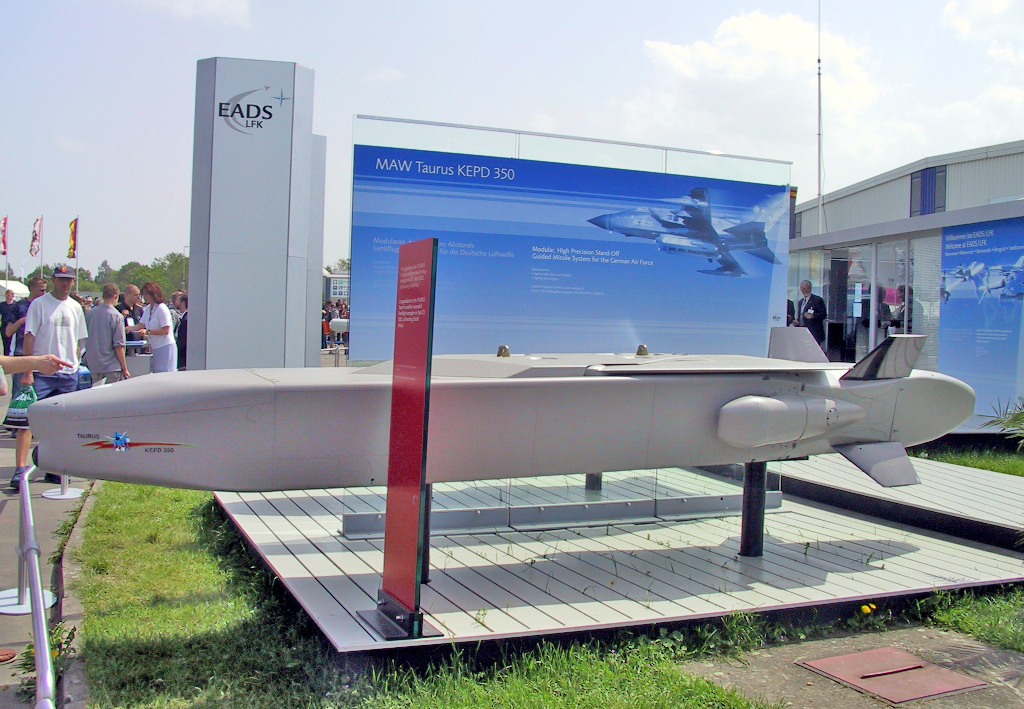
Taurus KEPD 350 cruise missile

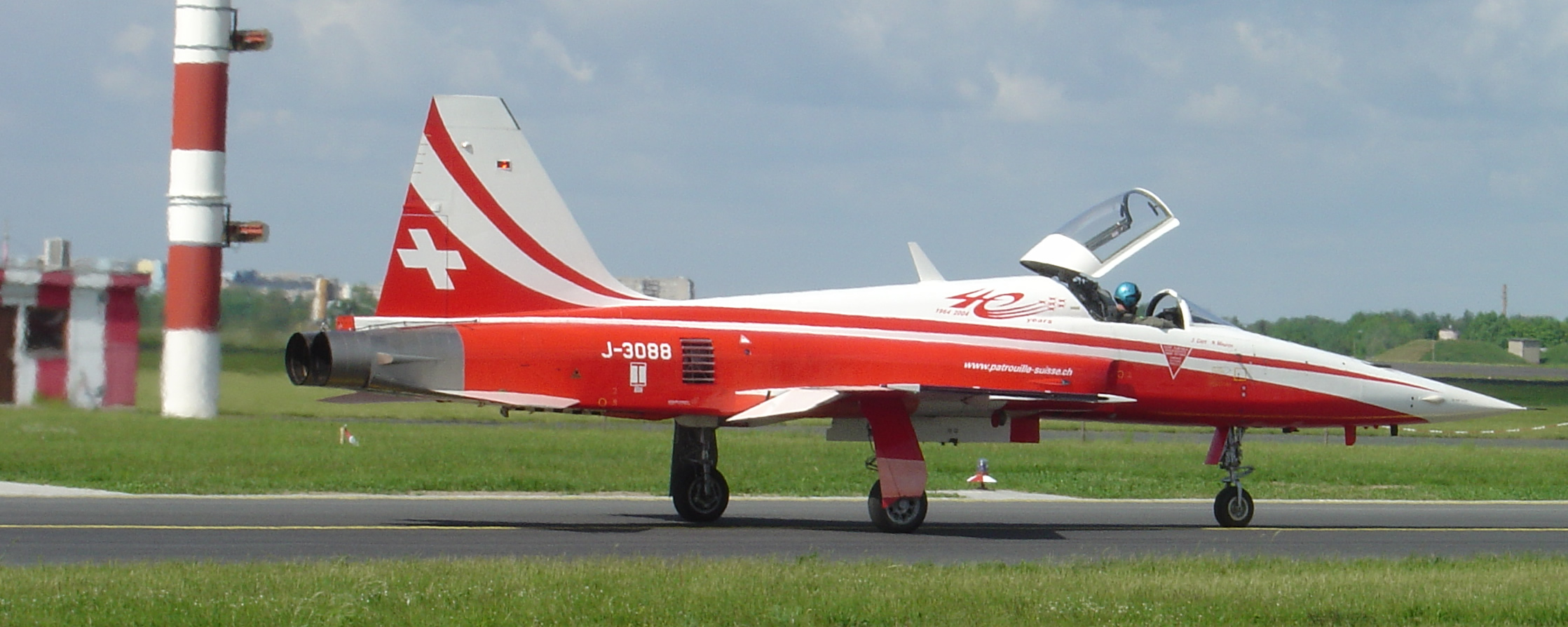
Patrouille Suisse

Logo ILA 2004

== ILA 2006 ==
All previous attendance records had been broken at ILA2006. More than 250,000 visitors (2004: 201,500, +25%) were recorded at the ILA2006 between 16 and 21 May, including 115,000 trade visitors (2004: 105,000). Events on the southern section of Berlin-Schönefeld airport were dominated by the signing of sales contracts and joint venture agreements worth billions, a display featuring some 340 aircraft, many of them making their first public appearance, and the largest number of delegations and conferences ever. 1,014 exhibitors from 42 countries (2004: 987 from 42 countries) presented products, systems and processes from every area of the aerospace industry. Several thousand experts from all over Europe and from overseas attended the more than 90 accompanying conferences in search of information. Some 4,100 media representatives from 70 countries provided comprehensive coverage of the main technical themes and the attractions for the public at the ILA2006.

Eurocopter Tiger of the German Army during the ILA 2006

ILA 2006 emphasised the importance of this sector for Germany in its role as a centre for the aerospace industry. Hans-Joachim Gante, Chief Executive of the BDLI, stated: "We have become one of the few sectors with sustainable growth in Germany, due above all to our innovative strengths." This was clearly demonstrated at the ILA2006, which is acquiring an increasingly international dimension, thereby strengthening its role as one of the world's major meeting places for the industry. This was an ideal opportunity for the German aerospace industry to demonstrate that it is among the world leaders." Exhibitors expressed their satisfaction with the discussions and contacts and with the business deals that were finalised at this event. "In particular the decision to make Russia the partner country proved highly effective. Russia was very strongly represented and was able to establish numerous contacts and business links."

At the close of the event Stefan Grave, Project Director for Messe Berlin GmbH, summed up: "The ILA2006 underlined its major importance as a European marketing platform for this sector as well as again demonstrating its many attractions for the public. Trade visitors and the general public alike were fascinated by the high-tech products on display. Unprecedented numbers of people attended to see the Airbus A380, an outstanding international flying display and the Space Hall.

Many high-ranking delegations attended, especially during the three Trade Visitors’ Days. In addition to the Federal Minister of Economics Michael Glos, the ILA 2006 also received visits from the Defence Minister Franz-Josef Jung, Minister of the Interior Wolfgang Schäuble, Transport Minister Wolfgang Tiefensee, the Minister at the Chancellor's Office Dr. Thomas de Maizière and the heads of the regional governments in Brandenburg and Berlin, Matthias Platzeck and Klaus Wowereit. Germany's armed forces, the Bundeswehr, were very strongly represented: the Chief of the Armed Forces Wolfgang Schneiderhan attended the ILA 2006, as did the Chiefs of Staff of the Air Force and Army, Klaus-Peter Stieglitz and Hans-Otto Budde. A number of ministers from other countries also visited this event, accompanied by high-ranking delegations, thereby underlining the international importance of the ILA 2006. Among them were, from the partner country Russia, the Minister of Emergency Situations Sergei Shoigu, the Minister of Defence of the Netherlands, Henk Kamp, the Greek Defence Minister Vangelis Meimarakis, the French Transport Minister Dominique Perben, the Slovenian Defence Minister Karl Erjavec, the Albanian Defence Minister Fatmir Mediu and the Ukrainian Industry Minister Volodymyr Shandra. In addition 70 parliamentarians from 17 European countries were welcomed at the ILA2006.

The ILA2006 was organised jointly by the association representing the German aerospace industry, Bundesverband der Deutschen Luft- und Raumfahrtindustrie (BDLI) e.V., Berlin, and by Messe Berlin GmbH.

== ILA 2008 ==
ILA 2008 was held between 27 May and 1 June 2008 on the southern section of Berlin-Schönefeld Airport, which has been designated as the future Berlin Brandenburg International Airport (BBI). Chancellor of Germany Angela Merkel attended the opening ceremony and welcomed international guests, among which a special place was dedicated to Indian operators, as India was chosen as 2008 edition's partner country. Special events were planned as part of 60th Anniversary of the Berlin Airlift celebration. UK and US veterans from the cold war age Berlin airlift were invited as ILA's special guests. Other guests were the US Air Force with a B-1B Lancer, the Poland Air Force and the Slovak Air Force with MiG-29 Fulcrum, Airbus with the A380 and the Patrouille Suisse.

ILA exhibitions
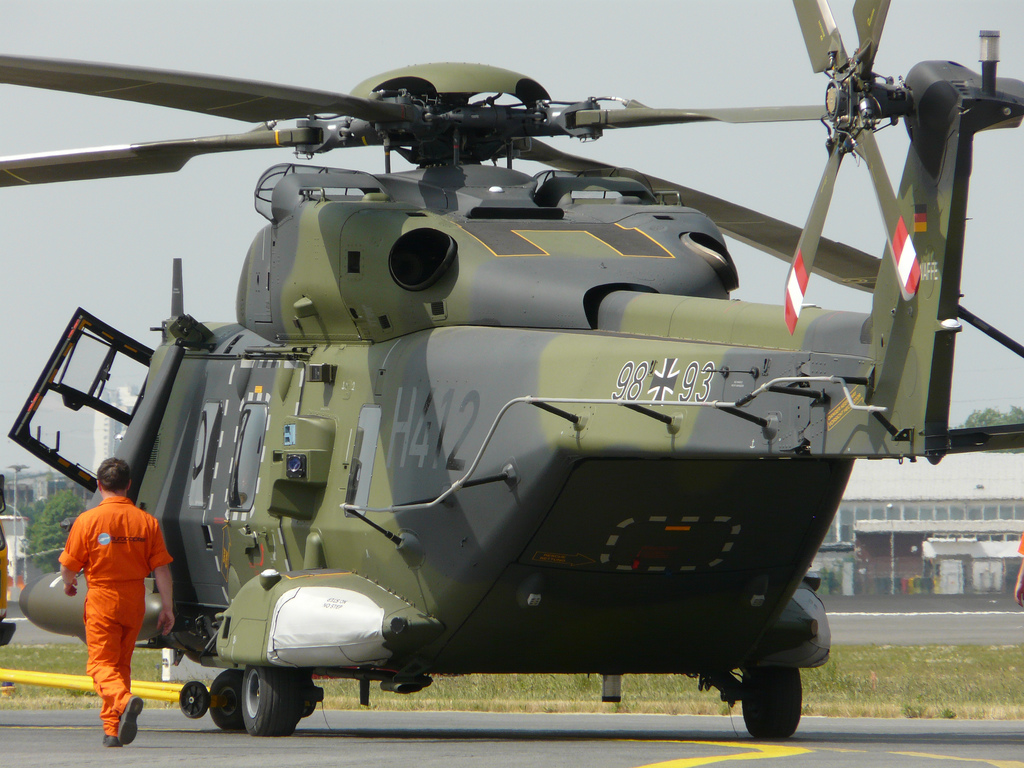
NHIndustries NH90

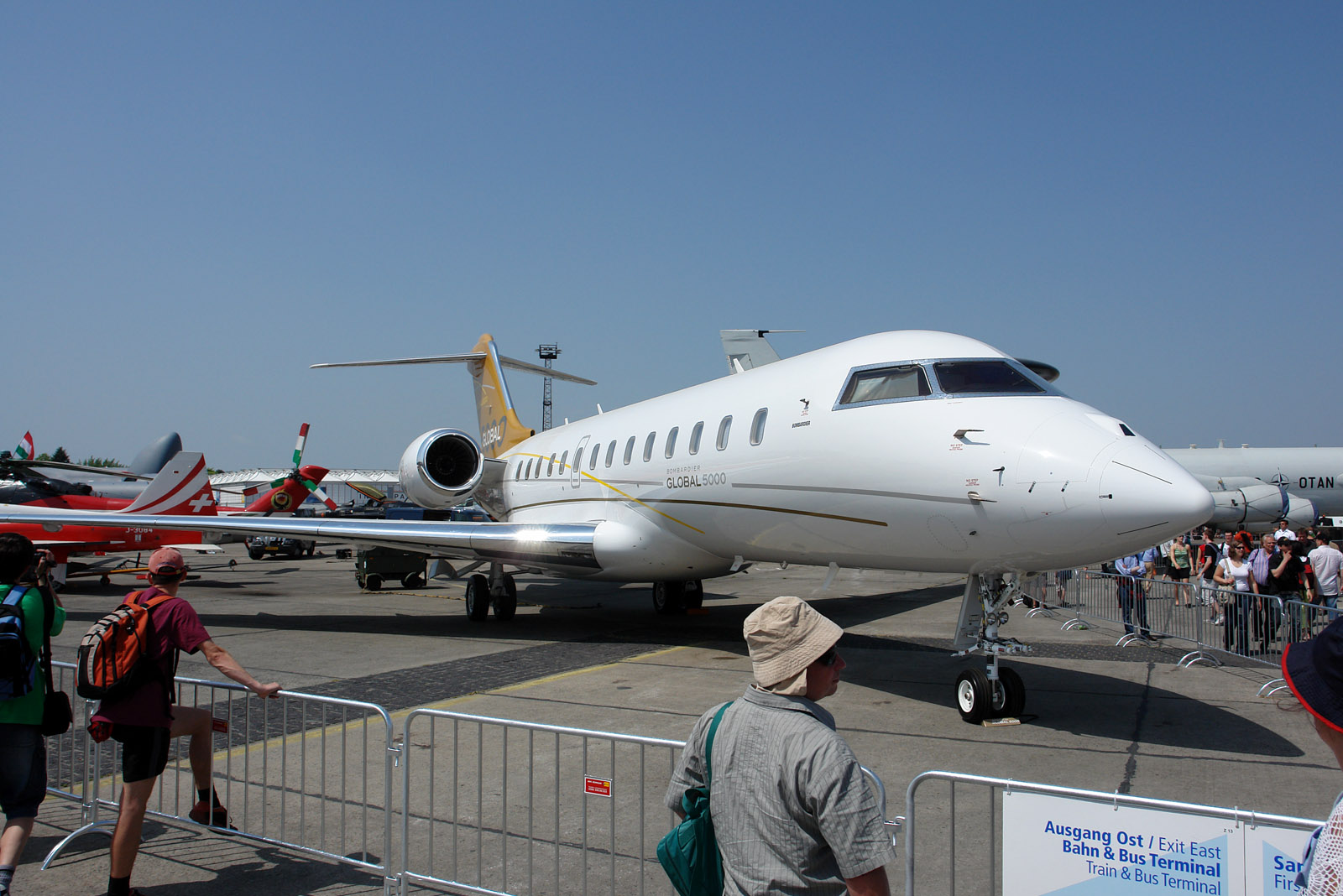
Bombardier Global 5000

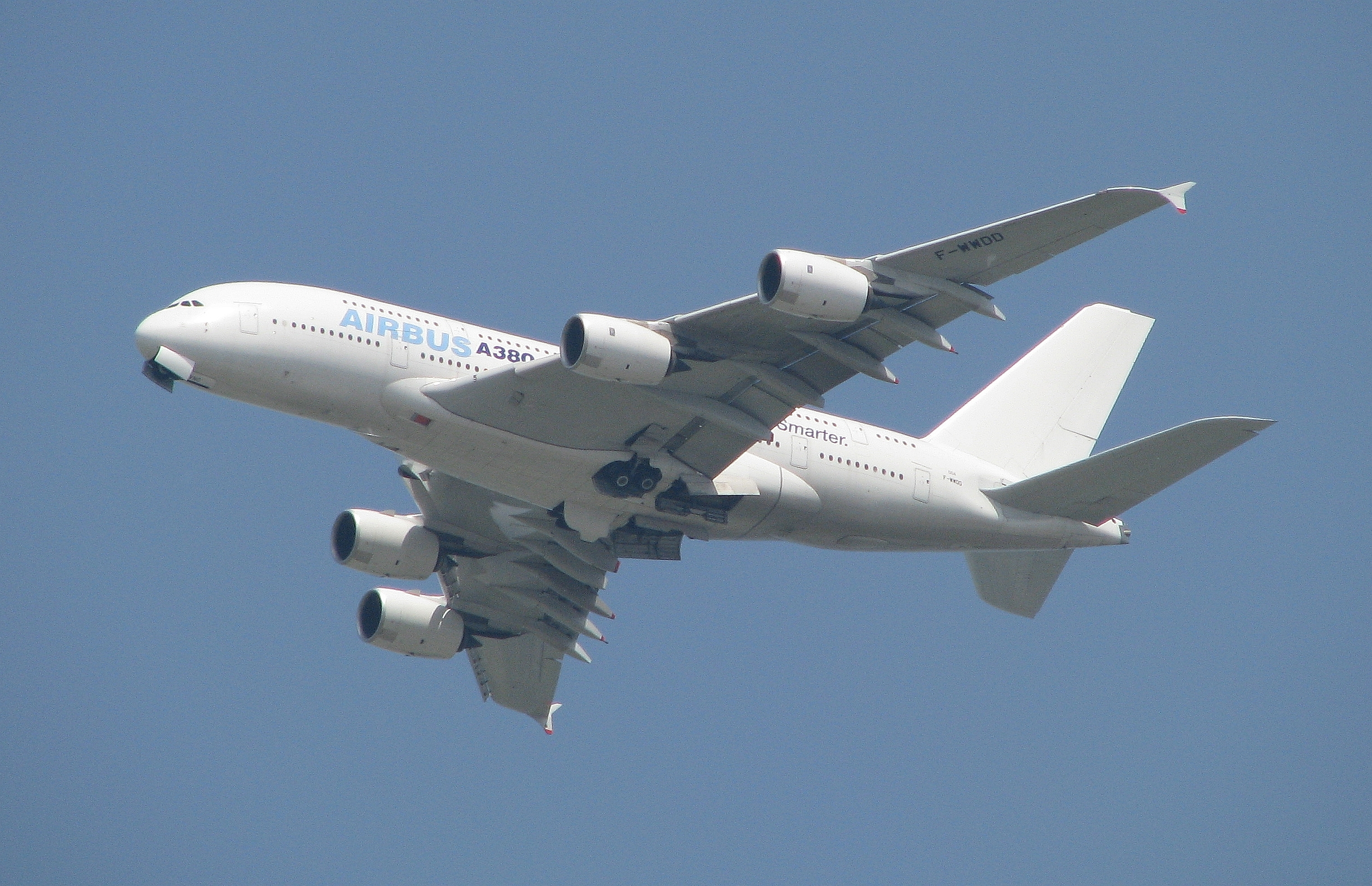
Airbus A380

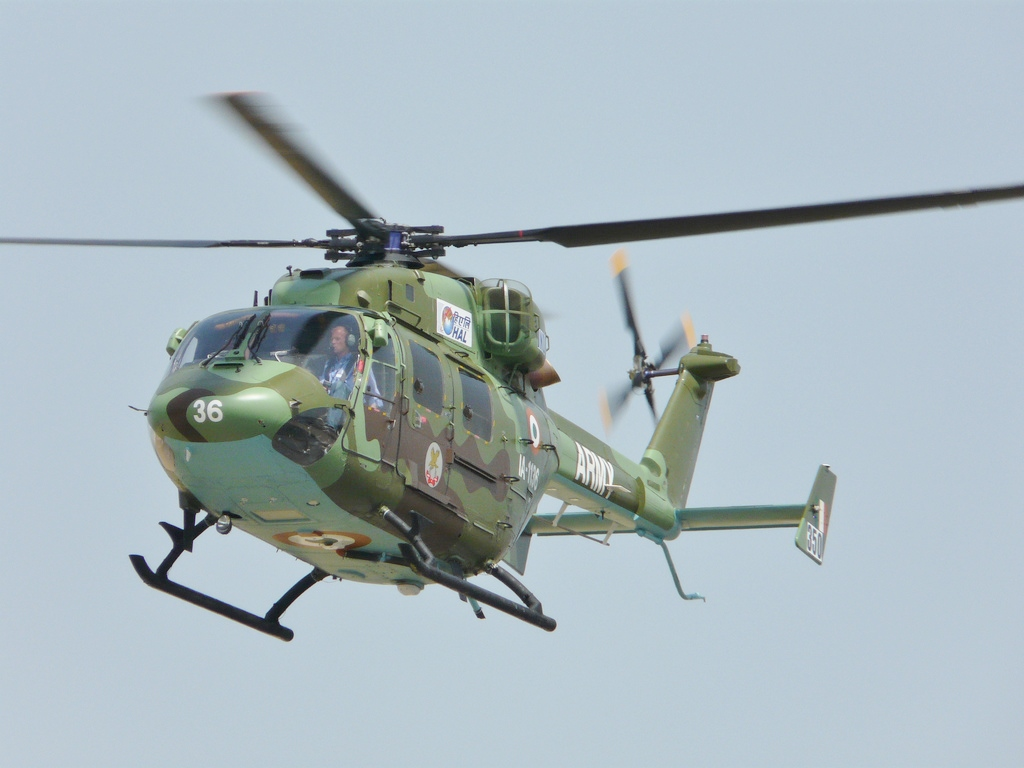
HAL Dhruv

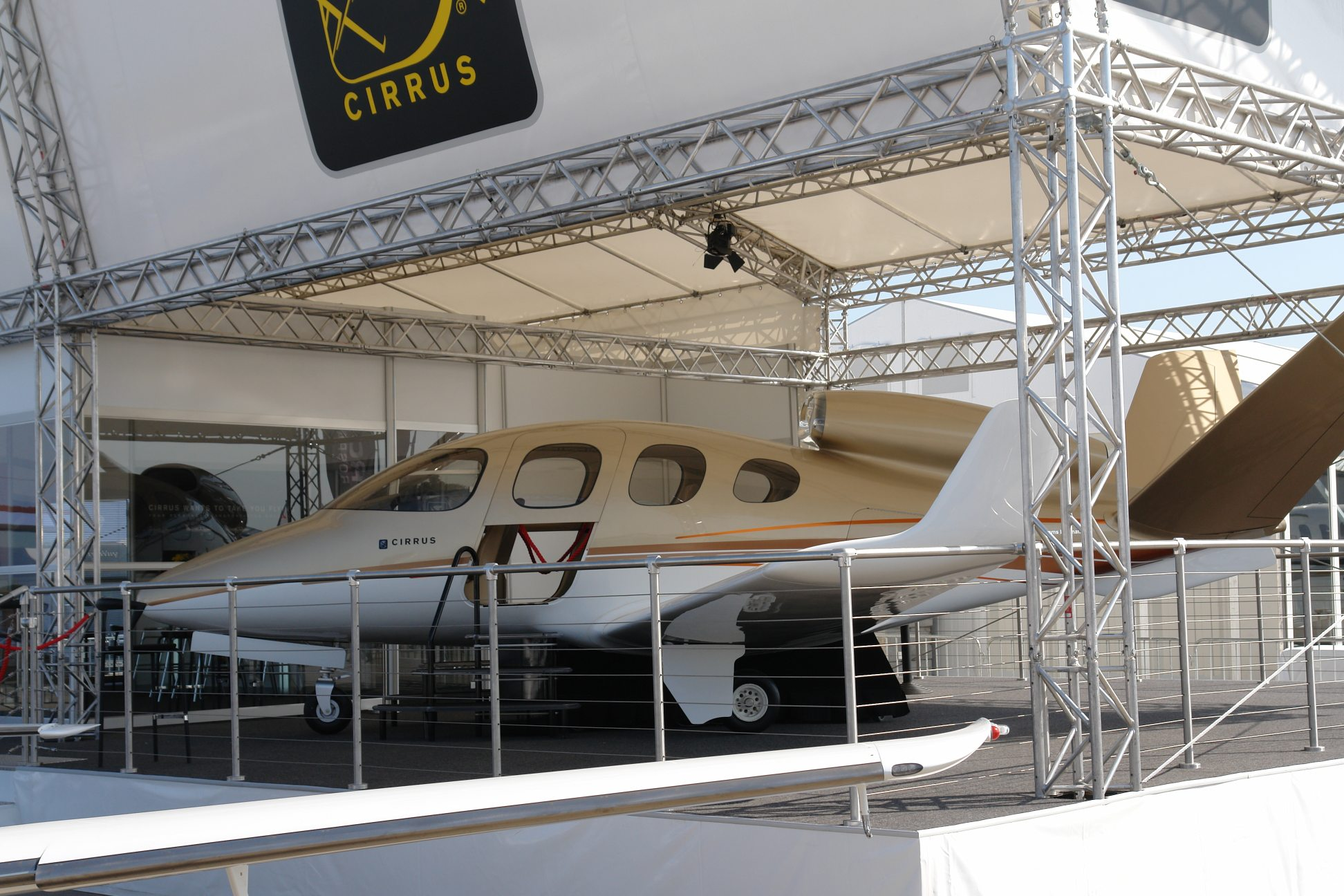
Cirrus Vision SF50

== ILA 2010 ==
At ILA Berlin Air Show 2010, 1,153 exhibitors from 47 countries presented their products and services to 235,000 visitors, of whom 125,000 were trade visitors. Around 300 aircraft were on display at the trade show. During the ILA 2010, Airbus alone received orders worth 15,3 billion US-Dollars, among them the then-biggest order in civil aviation history on 32 additional Airbus A380 by Emirates.

== ILA 2012 ==
The ILA Berlin Air Show in 2012 was held at an exhibition ground next to the newly built Berlin Brandenburg Airport (BER) in Schönefeld, Germany. Poland was chosen as 2012's partner country of the ILA Berlin Air Show.

ILA exhibitions
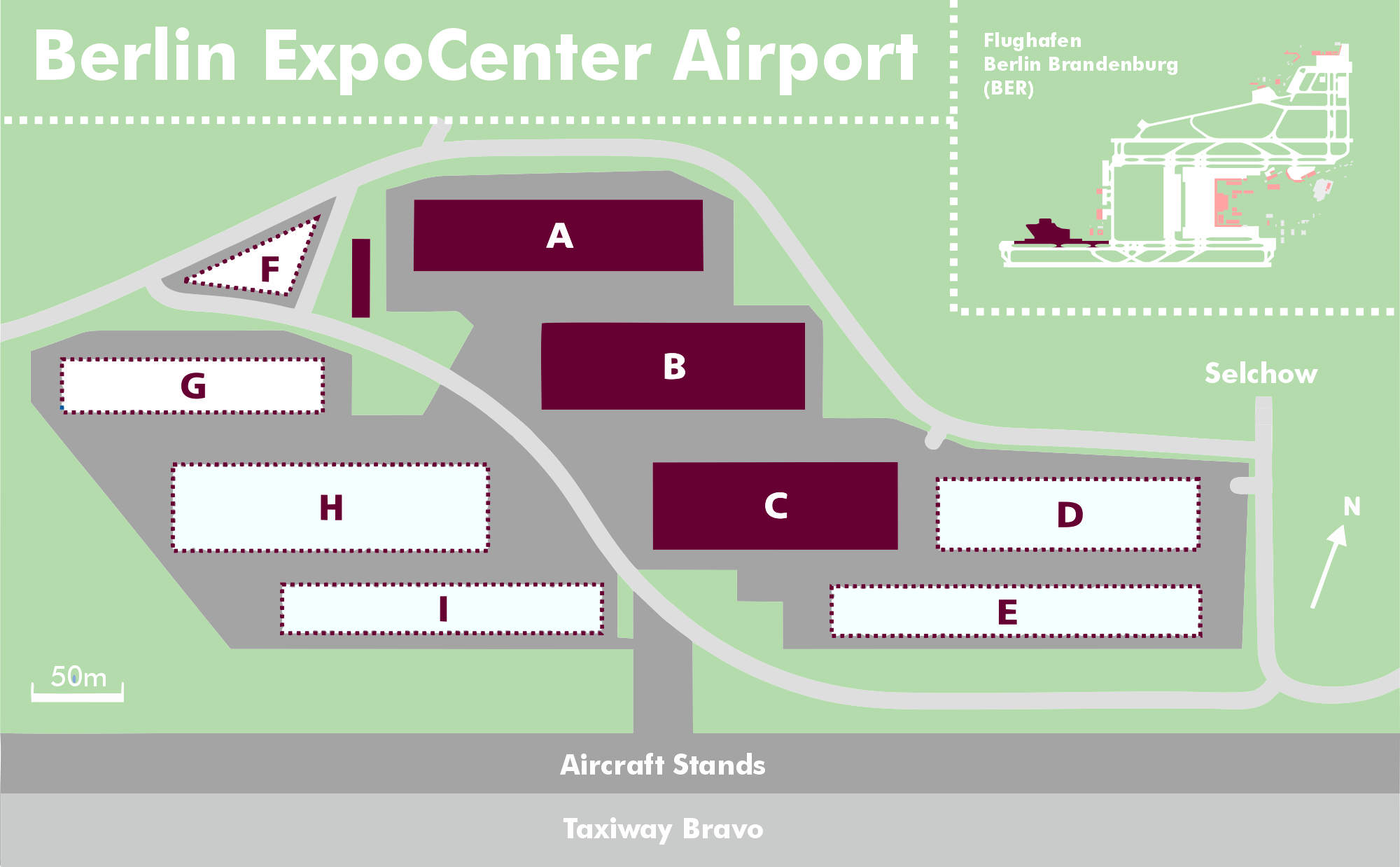
In 2012 the ILA took place at the Berlin ExpoCenter Airport

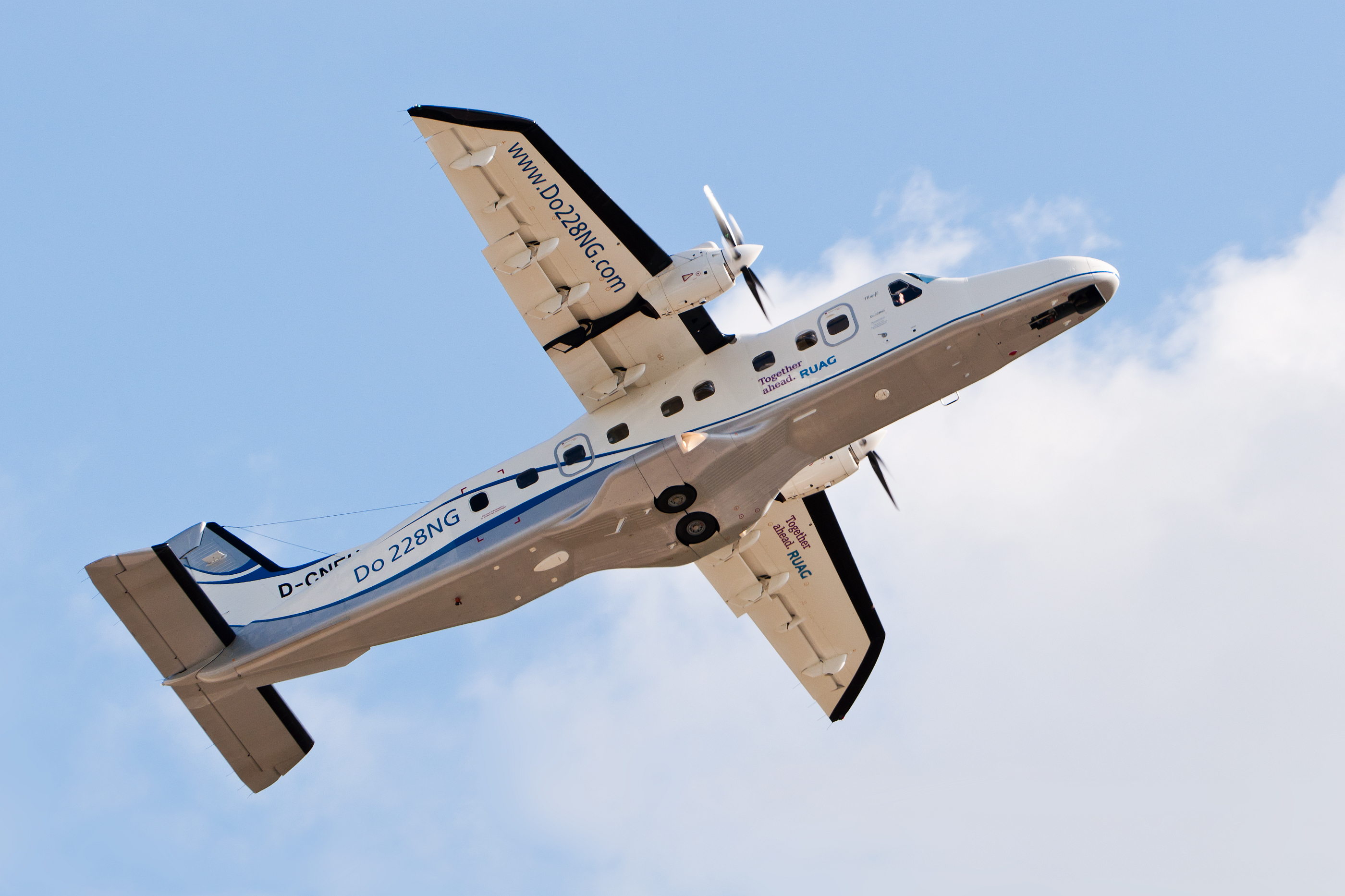
Dornier 228NG built by RUAG Aviation

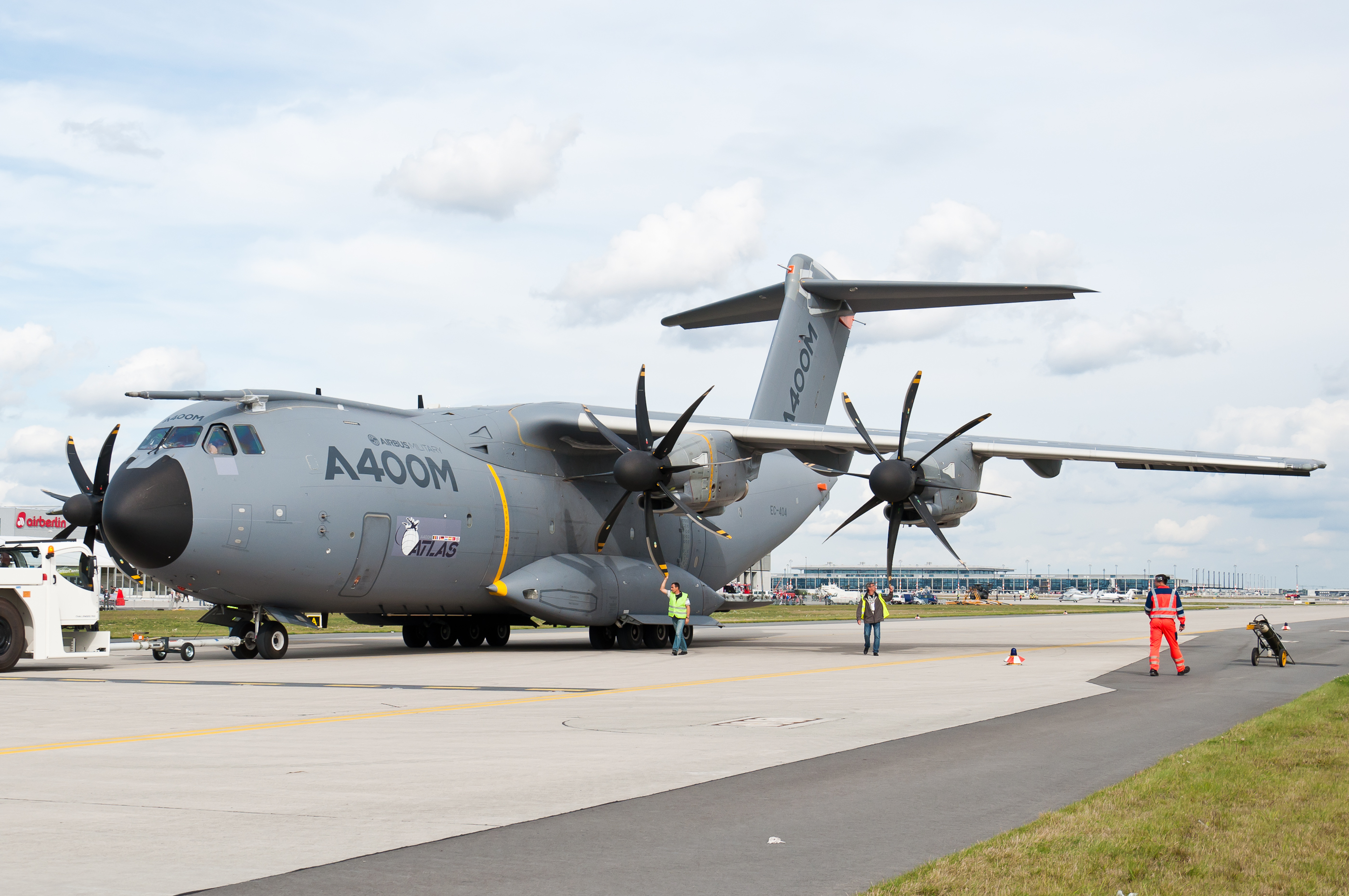
The fourth Airbus A400M test aircraft

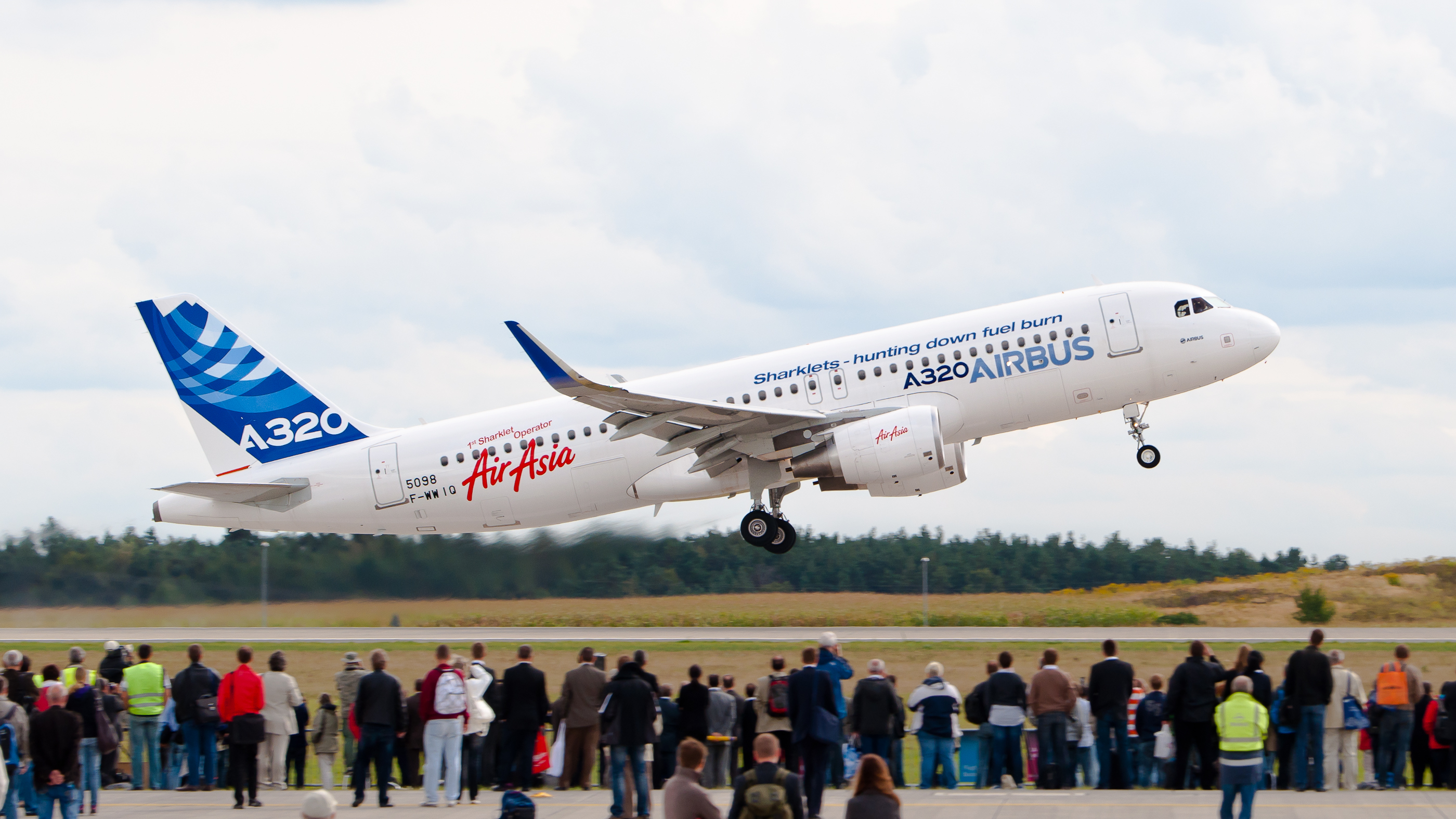
Airbus A320 with newly developed Sharklets

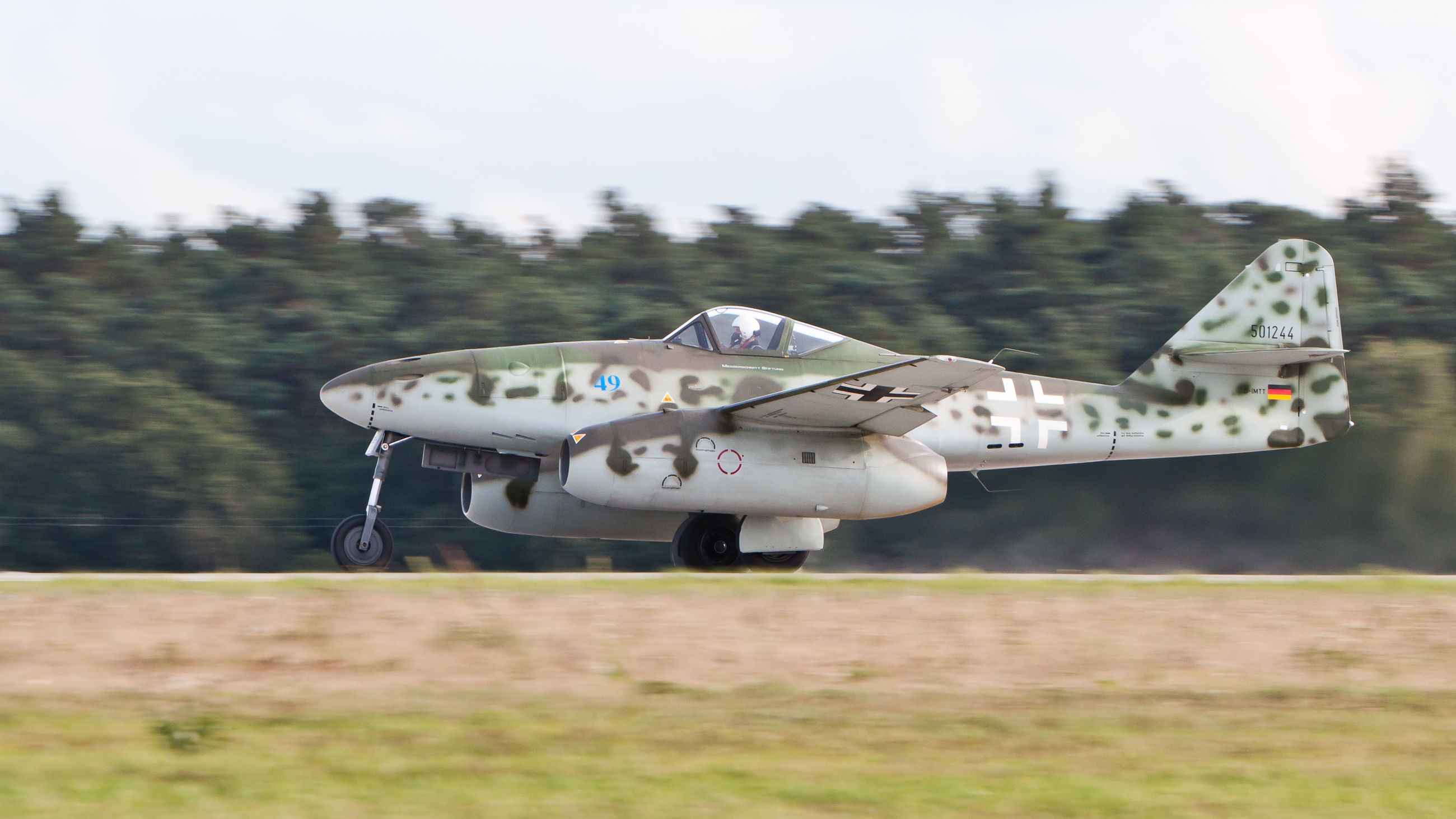
Messerschmitt Me 262 replica

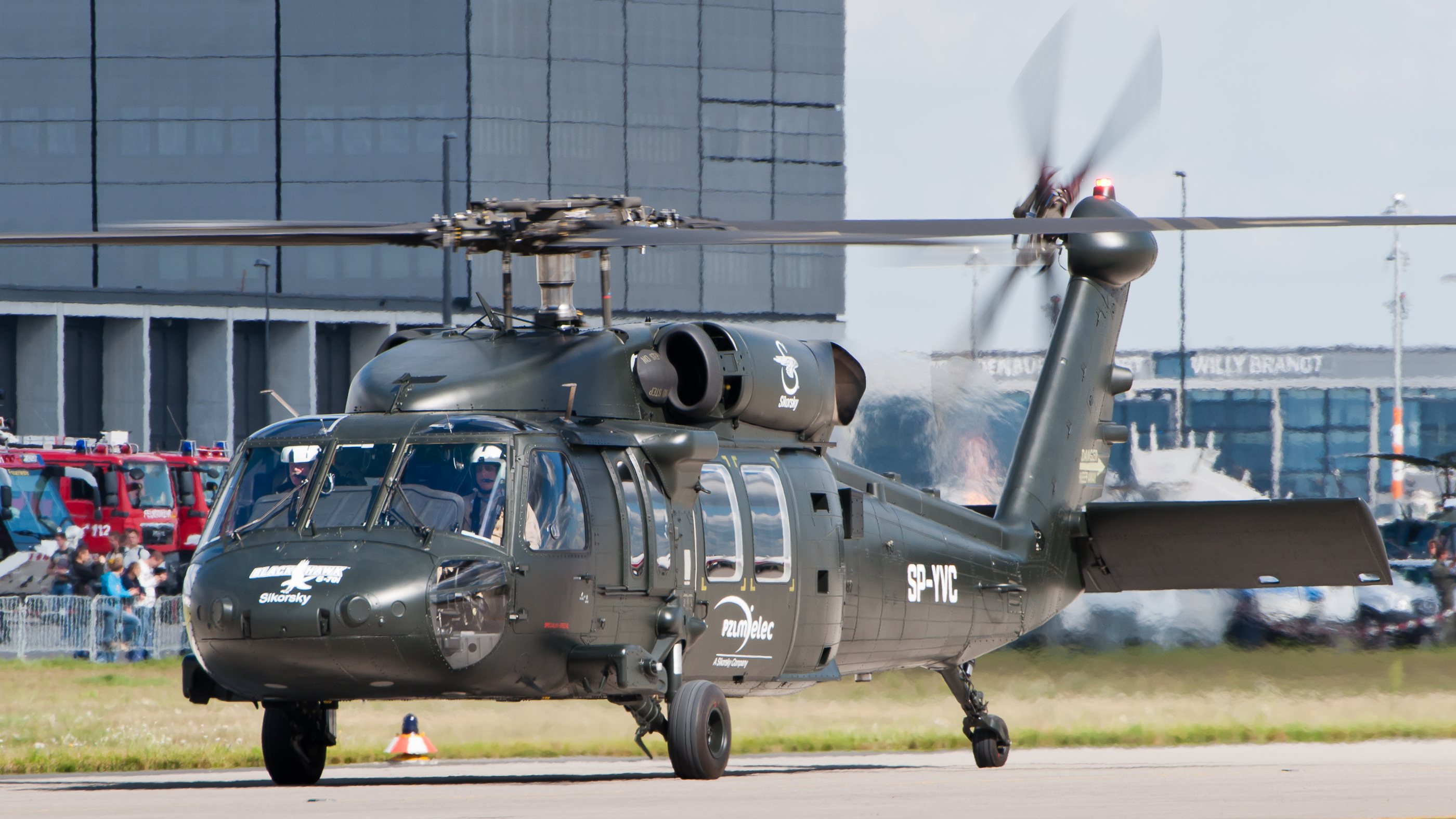
Sikorsky S-70i Black Hawk built by PZL Mielec from Poland

== ILA 2022 ==
ILA 2022 took place from June 22–26, 2022. About 60 aircraft were presented at the show. The Bundeswehr was the largest exhibitor. Around 72,000 visitors and 550 exhibitors took advantage of the event.

== See also ==
- List of air shows
