= Berlin ExpoCenter Airport =

Coordinates: 52.35163°N 13.47304°E

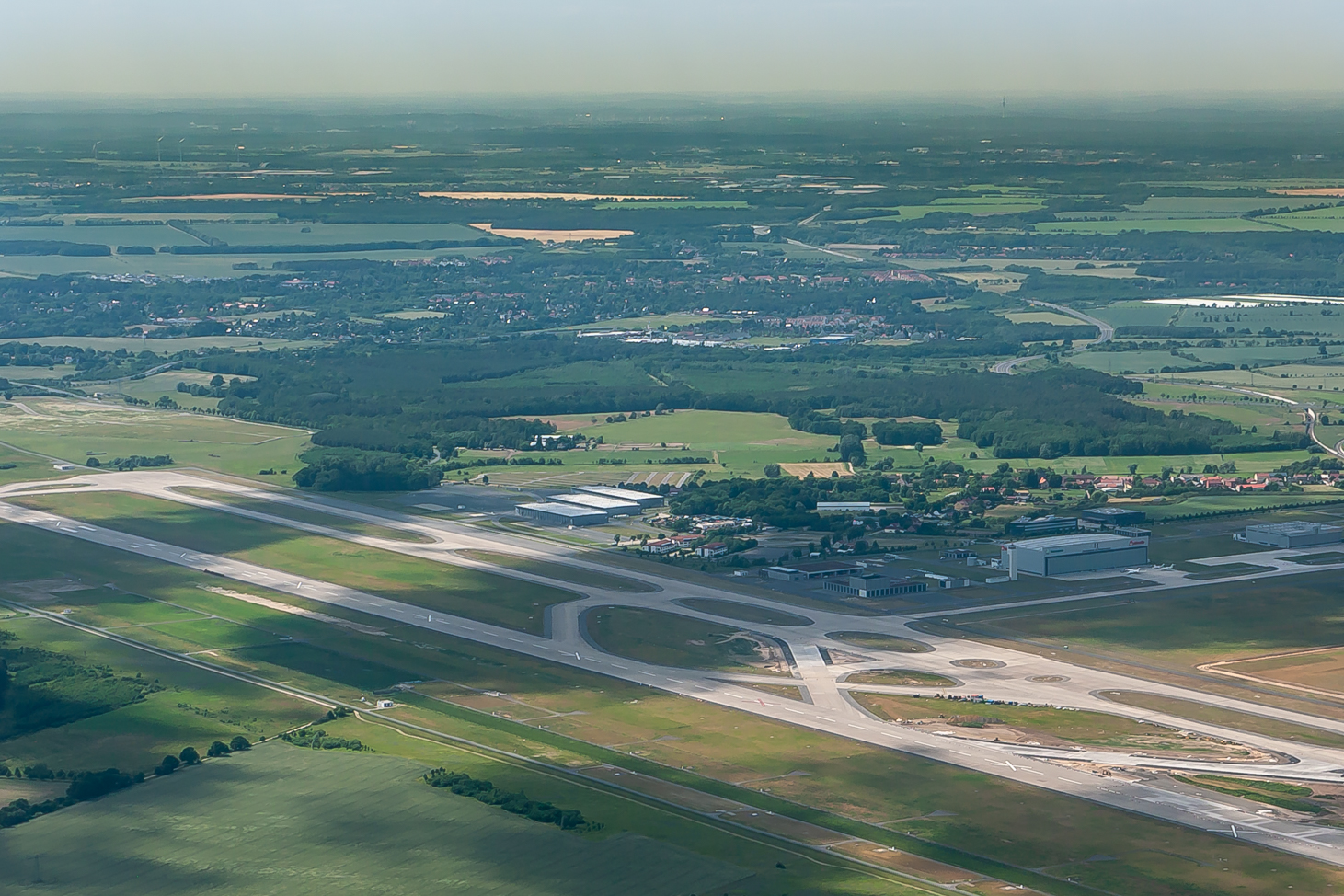
Berlin ExpoCenter Airport

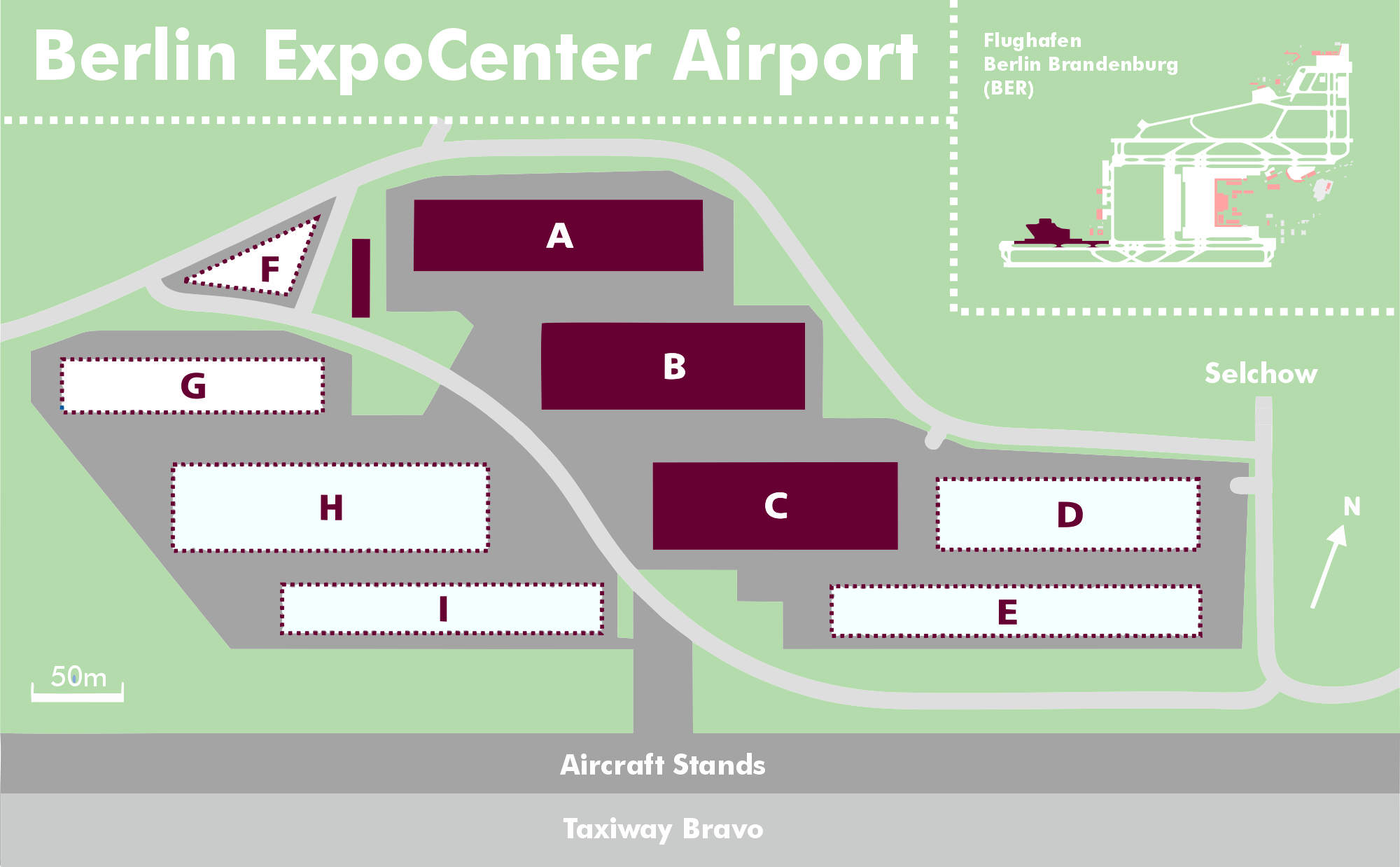
map of the area

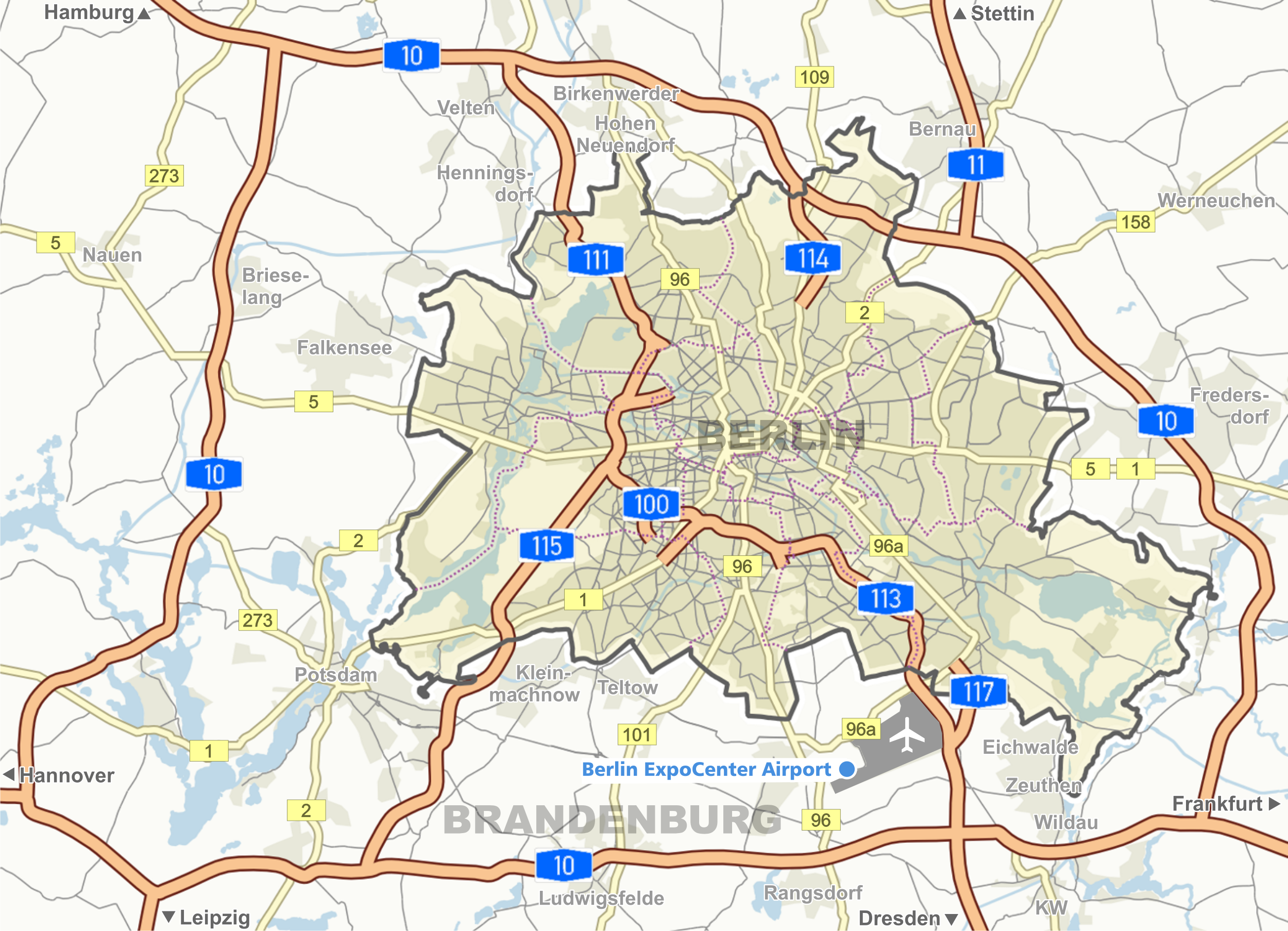
location south of the city

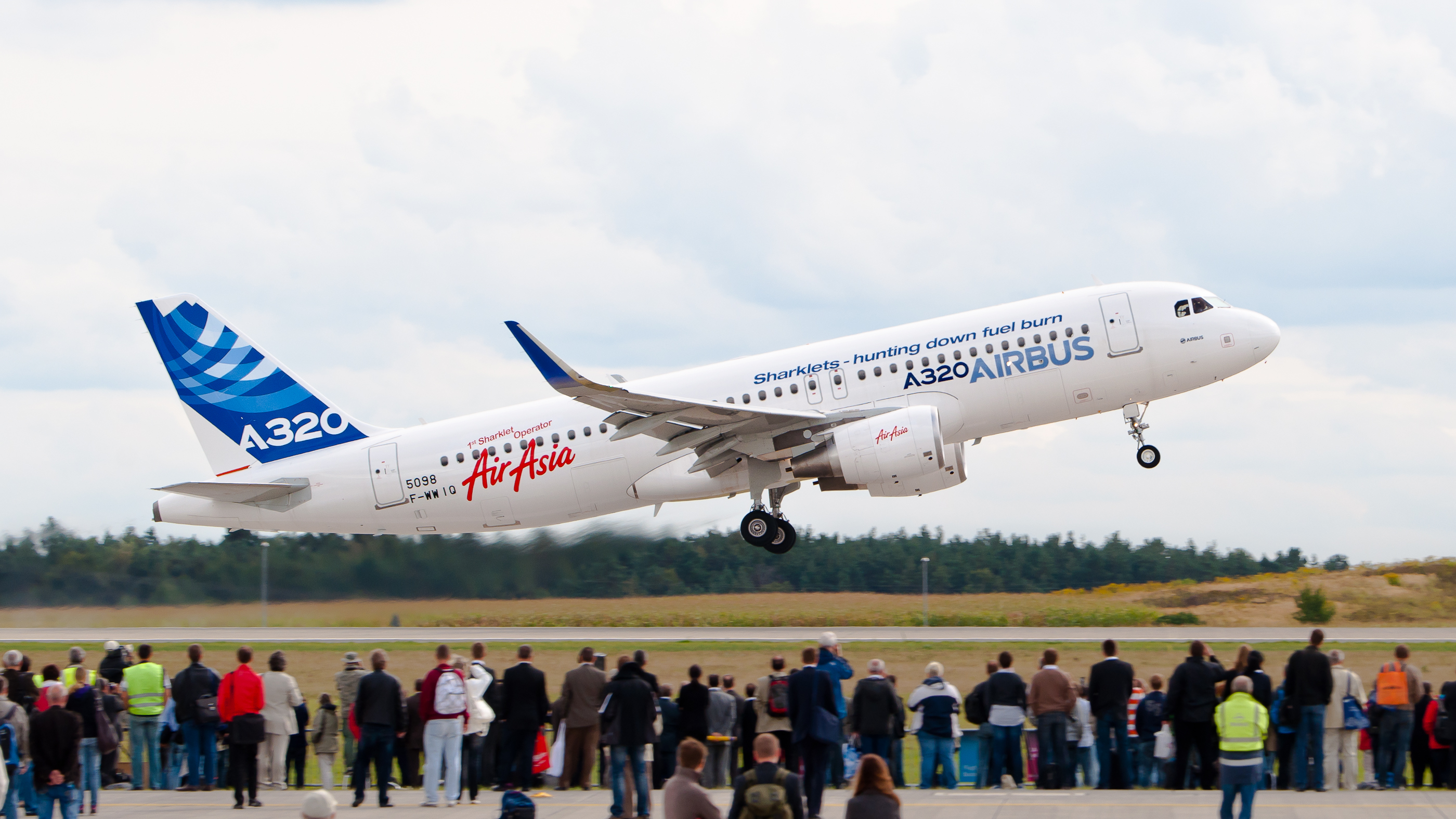
Visitors to the Berlin Air Show watching a flight display of an Airbus A320 (2012)

The Berlin ExpoCenter Airport (short BECA) is a multi-purpose exhibition centre on the perimeter of Berlin Brandenburg Airport. The ExpoCenter is built to host aviation-related fairs, like the ILA Berlin Air Show.

== Planning ==
Construction of the ExpoCenter Airport Berlin Brandenburg commenced in August 2011 and concluded by April 2012. The main exhibition grounds span approximately 250,000 square meters (62 acres), featuring halls, chalet areas for aircraft displays, and outdoor spaces for spectators and access routes.

The operating company, initially known as Messeimmobilien Selchow GmbH (MIS), invested €27 million in developing the new grounds. In May 2012, the company was renamed ExpoCenter Airport Berlin Brandenburg GmbH (ECA) and relocated to the new exhibition grounds. Additionally, Messe Berlin contributed €16 million towards constructing three permanent display halls.

Since its inauguration, the ExpoCenter Airport has become a significant venue for various events, including the PANORAMA Berlin fashion show, which debuted in January 2013 as part of Berlin Fashion Week.

== Exhibitions ==
=== 2012 ===
- 04. to 06. June: Panorama (Berlin Fashion Week)
- 11. to 16. September: ILA Berlin Air Show
