= Socomore Group =

French company

Socomore
- Type: Private company
- Industry: Chemical products manufacturing for the treatment of metal surfaces and composite materials
- Founder: Jean Bossuet
- Headquarters: Vannes, France
- Website: socomore.com

Socomore Group is a French company founded in 1972 by Jean Bossuet with its headquarters in Vannes, Morbihan.

== History ==
Socomore was founded in 1972 in Vannes, Morbihan, by Jean Bossuet. Initially, the company began by manufacturing detergents for cleaning Paris Métro tunnels. In 1998, Frédéric Lescure acquired the company and created the Méaban Group, which was rebranded later to Socomore Group. In 2012, Socomore opened its factory in Elven.

In 2015, the company founded Socomore Ventures, an investment fund for startups and technologies. Socomore Ventures has invested in companies such as Centiloc, Isybot, Waoup, Bouge ta Boite, and Teratonics. In July 2018, Socomore raised €53.5 million through a fundraising round, supported by CM-CIC Investissement, RAISE, ACE Management, and Bpifrance.

In April 2020, during the COVID-19 pandemic, Socomore launched Socosafe, a safety kit for businesses, and opened its new factory in Rhome, Texas. In December 2022, Socomore started a partnership with Molecular Plasma Group (MPG) for the commercialization of MPG technology in the aeronautics, defense, and railway sectors.

In March 2023, Socomore signed a collaboration agreement with Rescoll to develop and market intumescent paints and thermal barriers designed by Rescoll for the aeronautical industry, and in May, Socomore and Aerowash entered into an agreement to develop an aircraft exterior cleaning solution, combining Aerowash's AW3 washing robot with Socomore's products.

In November 2024, Socomore signed a licensing agreement with 3CHEM Corporation for the manufacturing and distribution of 3CHEM products across the EMEA, Asia-Pacific, and India regions. During the same month, the company entered into a partnership with the Hontek Corporation to develop anti-corrosion coatings for wind power. In the same month, Olnica which was acquired by Socomore in April 2022, launched the TagMPR project in partnership with Morbihan-based Elixance Polymers and the ComposiTIC research laboratory.

== Acquisitions and subsidiaries ==
In 2011, Socomore acquired the Canadian company MagChem which produces cleaning products for aerospace engine parts. In the following year, Socomore bought out its partner Babbco, a French company that produces equipment for the non-destructive testing of metal parts via magnetic particle inspection or penetrant testing.

In 2013, Socomore acquired Dyso and Dynamold, which manufactures aeronautic cleaning solvents and acquired the PT Technologies factory in Cork, Ireland, which produces cleaning wipes for the aeronautics and energy sectors.

In August 2016, Socomore acquired the Aeroglaze and Chemglaze brands from the North American group Lord Corporation, and obtained the global license for Lord UltraConductive, an anti-lightning product for aircraft. The following year, the company acquired Elixair, a UK-based company specializing in scrapers and accessories for removing excess sealants from aircraft part assemblies. In January 2018, Socomore announced the acquisition of Sea to Sky Innovations, a Canadian company based in Burnaby that designs water-based paint strippers and surface treatments. In April 2019, Socomore acquired the aeronautical coatings business of the French group, Mäder.

In 2021, Socomore acquired the Salveco laboratory, which produces plant-based and biodegradable disinfection products. The company also acquired Products Techniques (PTI) coatings and solvents activities. In April 2022, Socomore acquired Olnica, a company specialized in product traceability.

In June 2023, Socomore announced an investment of €12 million in its industrial unit in Elven, with €5 million dedicated to a new paint production unit for aeronautics. In September, Socomore increased its stake in Flamemaster from 23% to 75%. In May 2024, Socomore announced the acquisition of Microset Products, a company based in Hinckley specialized in non-destructive testing.

Socomore Ventures has invested in Centiloc, Isybot, Waoup, Bouge ta Boite, and Teratonics.
