= GGB (company) =

American manufacturer

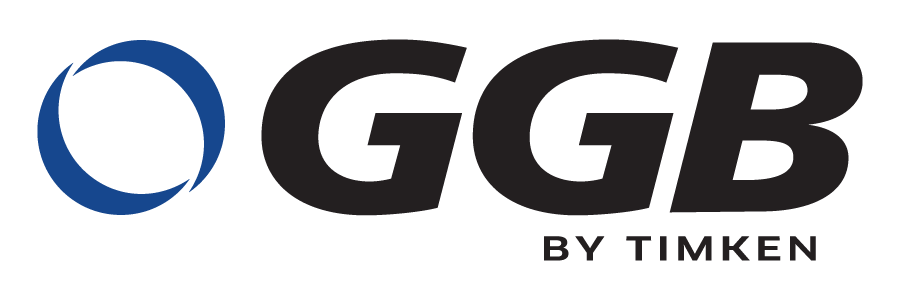
- Formerly: Glacier Garlock Bearings; GGB Bearing Technology
- Industry: Manufacturing
- Founded: 1899; 127 years ago
- Founder: Cuyler W. Findlay; A. J. Battle
- Headquarters: Thorofare, New Jersey, United States
- Number of locations: 7 manufacturing facilities in the U.S., Germany, France, Brazil, Slovakia and China
- Area served: Worldwide
- Products: Metal-polymer, engineered plastics, fiber reinforced and metallic plain bearings; bearing housings; polymer coatings
- Number of employees: 900
- Parent: The Timken Company (2022–present)
- Website: www.ggbearings.com

GGB (formerly Glacier Garlock Bearings, then GGB Bearing Technology) manufactures self-lubricating, prelubricated plain bearings and tribological polymer coating for various industries and applications. It has production facilities in the U.S., Germany, France, Slovakia, Brazil and China.

Founded in 1899, the company manufactures metal-polymer bearings, engineered plastics bearings, fiber reinforced composite bushings, metal and bimetal bearings & thrust plates and bearing assemblies.

On November 7, 2022, The Timken Company completed the acquisition of GGB.

== History ==
GGB was created in 1899 in London, England by Cuyler W. Findlay and A. J. Battle founded Findlay Motor Metals which was later renamed Glacier Antifriction Metal Company.

GGB Bearing Technology was formed in 1976 as a joint venture between Garlock Inc., which was established after Olin J. Garlock invented a system for sealing piston rods in industrial steam engines in Palmyra, N.Y. in 1886 or 1887, and Glacier Antifriction Metal Company, which had been founded in 1899. Garlock had been the US distributor for Glacier's bearings from 1958.

Glacier developed the industry's first metal-polymer bearing with bronze and polytetrafluoroethylene (PTFE) lining; these DU® self-lubricating bushes, launched in 1956, are still being manufactured, specified and used today, and its DX® marginally-lubricated bearings, introduced in 1965, are still specified and used for applications where a thin film of lubricant is required.

In 2001 B.F. Goodrich's engineered industrial products division bought Glacier Garlock Bearings. In 2002 this division was spun off as EnPro Industries, Inc.

In 2004 Glacier Garlock Bearings changed its name to GGB Bearing Technology, dropping Bearing Technology in 2018 to GGB.

In 2012 its DU® bearings were used in the sampling drill spindle on NASA's Curiosity Rover on Mars.

In 2015 GGB introduced the HPMB® self-lubricating fiber reinforced composite bushing with machinable liner used heavily in hydro power applications and more.

In 2019, GGB launched a variety of new products including its high temperature solution, PyroSlide® 1100, a UV- resistant plastics material EP®15 and introduced its new polymer TriboShield™ coatings solutions.

In November 2022, GGB has been acquired by The Timken Company.

== Industries ==
The company's bearings are used by the automotive, aerospace, agriculture, construction, medical, fluid power, compressor, off-highway, recreational equipment, renewable energy, oil & gas, and primary metals production industries.

== Present day operations ==
GGB plain bearings are found in a variety of applications worldwide. The DX® bearing is used in the Lokomat® Pro, a functional robotics system used to improve mobility in individuals following neurological diseases and injuries. Additionally, GGB products can be found in the Gateshead Millennium Bridge (GGB-DB monometal maintenance free bearing), the miter gates of the Panama Canal (GGB-DB® cast bronze hemispherical bearing), and the Xiangjiaba Hydropower Plant (HPM and HPF® fiber reinforced composite bearings). GGB's EP, Engineered Plastics bearings can be found in the Hobie Cat 16 catamaran used by both beginner and veteran sailors.

== Certifications and Quality ==
GGB is certified for the aerospace industry's AS9100D quality standard in North America, Europe, and Asia. Other standards include ISO14001, ISO9001, IATF16949, and OHSAS 18001. GGB's EP®63, EP®43, DP4® and DU® materials are approved to FAR (Federal Aviation Regulations) 25.853 and FAR 25.855 making them suitable for interior aircraft applications.
