= Zhone =

American telecom company (1999–2016)

Zhone Technologies, Inc.
- Logo since 2025
- Industry: Telecommunications
- Founded: 1999
- Key people: Jeanette Symons; Mory Ejabat; Robert Dahl
- Website: zhone.com

Zhone Technologies, Inc. is a computer networking company specialized in fiber networking, access network equipment and cloud software founded in 1999.

== History ==
Zhone Technologies was founded in September 1999 by former executives of Ascend Communications, Jeanette Symons, Mory Ejabat and Robert Dahl. The company was backed by former Lucent Technologies executive Richard McGinn. It got investments from various venture capital businesses.

In 2000, New Enterprise Associates invested 55 million USD, CalPERS 50 million USD, Texas Pacific Group 150 million USD and KKR also 150 million USD. Some people from Ascend invested 50 million USD.

In 2000, Forbes magazine noted "direct competition with Zhone, for now, is scarce, or at least unorganized." Zhone co-founder Symons died in a plane crash in February 2008.

The company was known as DZS between 2020 and 2025

Former logo of Zhone from 1999 to 2016

In 2016, it merged with DASAN Network Solutions and became DASAN Zhone Solutions Inc. In 2020, it moved its headquartered from the San Francisco Bay Area to Plano. In August 2020, Charlie Vogt was named CEO and DASAN Zhone became DZS.

On March 14, 2025, DZS announced that they had filed for Chapter 7 bankruptcy.

On April 7, 2025, Canadian telecommunication provider MNSi Telecom announced to acquire the assets of DZS. That transaction was concluded on May 5, 2025 when the newly re-formed Zhone Technologies Inc. acquired substantially all of the assets of DZS.

Acquisitions
Logo	Company	Date	Sum (million USD)	Ref
	Premisys Communications Inc.	October 1999	248	
	CAG Technologies	November 1999	8.8	
	OptaPhones Systems	February 2000	2.2	
	Roundview	February 2000	0.3	
	Various product lines from Nortel	2001	Undisclosed	
	Xybridge	February 2001	72.7	
	Vpacket	July 2002	19.2	
	Tellium	2003	180	
	NEC Eluminant	2003	13.6	
	Gluon Networks	2004	7	
	Sorrento	2004	37	
	Paradyne Networks, Inc.	July 2005	183.6	
	Adaptive Spectrum and Signal Alignment, Inc. (ASSIA)	2022		
	RIFT	2023		
	Optelian	2023		
