= Patricia Russo =

American business executive (born 1952)

Patricia F. Russo
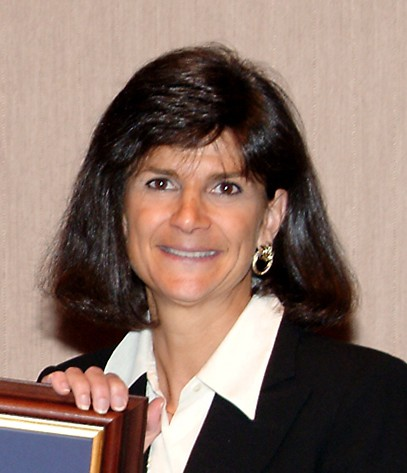
- Photo of Russo as member of the National Security Telecommunications Advisory Committee
- Born: Patricia Fiorello; June 12, 1952 (age 74); Trenton, New Jersey, United States
- Education: Georgetown University; Lawrence High School
- Occupation: Chairwoman of Hewlett Packard Enterprise
- Known for: CEO of Lucent Technologies, Alcatel-Lucent
- Board member of: Hewlett Packard Enterprise, Arconic

Patricia F. Russo (born June 12, 1952, in Trenton, New Jersey) is an American business executive. Russo was chief executive officer of Lucent Technologies, and its successor, Alcatel-Lucent, a communications equipment manufacturer. As of 2020, she is on the board of directors of General Motors, Merck & Co., and Arconic, Inc. She is chairwoman of the nonprofit organization, Partnership at Drugfree.org. Prior to the split of Hewlett-Packard into two companies in 2015, Russo was lead independent director. She is chairwoman of Hewlett Packard Enterprise.

Forbes Magazine rated Russo tenth on its List of the World's 100 Most Powerful Women in 2006.

== Career at Lucent ==
Russo joined Lucent's predecessor in 1982. In 1992, she became President of the Business Communications Systems division, moving in 1997 to become the executive vice president of Corporate Operations, and in 1999 to executive vice president and chief executive officer of the Service Provider Networks Group. She left in August 2000, after a reorganization; however, returned in January 2002 to become the chief executive officer. After "cutting costs and focusing on sales of wireless equipment, Russo was credited with returning Lucent to profitability in 2004, after three years of red ink." However, profits that year "came largely through slashes in spending, cuts to retiree benefits, and reductions in research-and-development budgets that spurred protests."

On April 2, 2006, it was announced that Russo would be chief executive officer of a new combined company resulting from the merger of the French communications company Alcatel and Lucent. This merger became effective on December 1, 2006. When Russo became the chief executive officer of the combined company, Serge Tchuruk, the former chief executive officer of Alcatel, remained as chairman.

The newly combined entity failed to turn a profit, and as a result, the company's management team resorted to rounds of restructuring and layoffs to address what were considered "challenging market conditions". The board eventually decided to oust the management team, and on July 29, 2008, Russo, along with Alcatel-Lucent chairman Serge Tchuruk, announced that she would step down by the end of 2008, in a broad-reaching management restructuring. Significant changes in the composition of the company's board were also announced. Alcatel-Lucent shares had lost more than 60% of their value since the merger.

In the statement released by Alcatel-Lucent relating to her departure, Russo was quoted as saying, "The company will benefit from new leadership aligned with a newly composed board to bring a fresh and independent perspective that will take Alcatel-Lucent to its next level of growth and development in a rapidly changing global market.". On September 2, 2008, she was replaced by Ben Verwaayen.

== Other activities ==
Russo spent nine months as the chief operations officer of Eastman Kodak, a position she left in January 2002 when she returned to Lucent to become their chief executive officer. She was also Chairwoman of Avaya, which was spun off from Lucent. Avaya, however, filed for bankruptcy in January 2017.

On July 23, 2009, General Motors announced that Russo would be a member of the company's new board of directors.

== Personal life ==
Russo was born in Trenton, New Jersey, and had six siblings. When she was in high school, she was active in sports and even became captain of a cheerleading squad before graduating from Lawrence High School in 1969. She earned a bachelor’s degree in political science and history from Georgetown University, Washington, D.C., in 1973.

Business positions
Preceded by Daniel A. Carp (acting)	COO of Eastman Kodak; April 16, 2001 – January 6, 2002	Succeeded by Daniel A. Carp (acting)
Preceded by Henry B. Schacht (acting)	CEO of Lucent Technologies; January 7, 2002 – November 30, 2006	Merged into Alcatel-Lucent
New creation	CEO of Alcatel-Lucent; December 1, 2006 – September 2, 2008	Succeeded by Ben Verwaayen
