= Alcatel-Lucent Enterprise =

French enterprise communication services company

ALE International SAS
- Trade name: Alcatel-Lucent
- Company type: Private
- Industry: Telecommunications
- Predecessors: Alcatel-Lucent
- Founded: 2014; 12 years ago
- Headquarters: 32 Avenue Kleber, 92700 Colombes, France
- Area served: Worldwide
- Products: Networking, cloud infrastructure, telecommunications equipment, software
- Owner: China Huaxin Post and Telecom Technologies
- Website: www.al-enterprise.com

ALE International SAS, trading as Alcatel-Lucent, is a French software company headquartered in Colombes, France, providing communication equipment and services to telecommunications companies, ISPs and data providers. The company was founded after China Huaxin Post and Telecom Technologies acquired the enterprise division of Alcatel-Lucent in 2014.

== History ==
=== Background ===
The company has origins in French telecommunications company Alcatel (acronym for the Société Alsacienne de Constructions Atomiques, de Télécommunications et d'Électronique), that formed as a result of a series of merges and acquisitions by Compagnie Générale d'Electricité (CGE) in the late 1960s. However, the predecessors of the company have been a part of telecommunications industry since the late 19th century.

In 2006, Alcatel-Lucent was formed by the merger of France-based Alcatel and U.S.-based Lucent Technologies, the latter being a successor of AT&T's Western Electric and Bell Labs.

=== Establishment ===
Alcatel-Lucent spun off its Enterprise division on 1 October 2014 to Chinese company China Huaxin Post and Telecommunication Economy Development Center (later renamed China Huaxin Post and Telecom Technologies). Alcatel-Lucent retained a 15% stake. ALE International continued to use the Alcatel-Lucent brand name, now licensed from Nokia, which purchased Alcatel-Lucent in 2015. In 2016, Alcatel-Lucent was merged into Nokia Networks, while Alcatel-Lucent Enterprise continued as a separate company.

== Technology and organization ==
The company develops infrastructure software for access networking, data centers, wireless networks, voice-over-IP, unified communications, contact centers, and cloud services, among others. In 2019, ALE was the first vendor to release a certified Wi-Fi 6 outdoor access point. In April 2021, it released two Wi-Fi 6 indoor access points. In May 2021, the company designed Rainbow Classroom, a cloud-based virtual classroom for educational institutions with communication tools for remote group learning.

Alcatel-Lucent Enterprise has its main offices at 32 Avenue Kleber in Colombes, France. The company operates its business through three main corporate divisions: Core Networking, Access and Other.
