= Ben Verwaayen =

Dutch politician and businessman (born 1952)

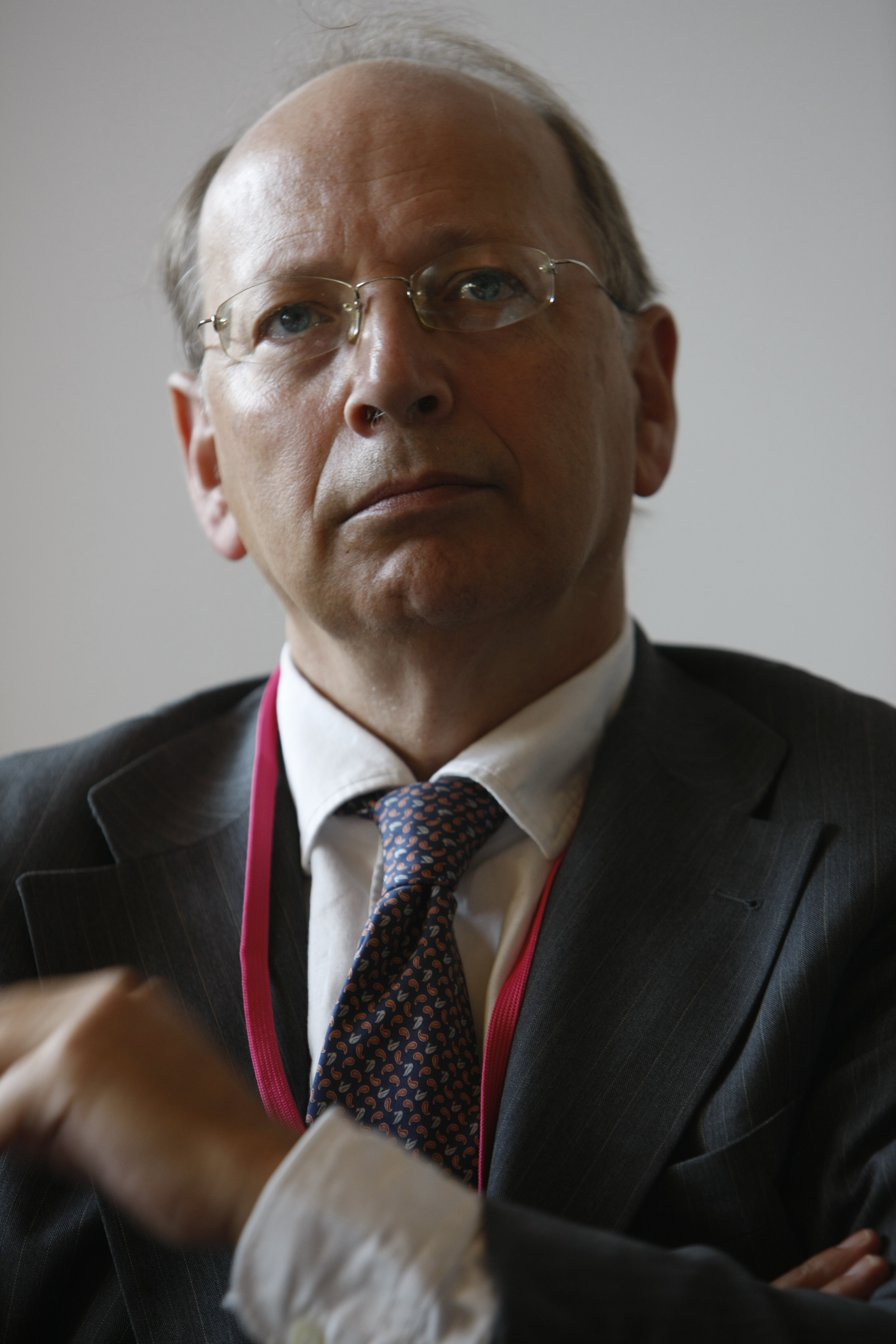
- Verwaayen in 2009
- Born: 11 February 1952 (age 74); Driebergen, Province of Utrecht
- Education: Driebergen school
- Alma mater: Utrecht University
- Occupation: CEO
- Employers: ITT Corporation (1975-1988); PTT Telecom (1988-1997); Lucent Technologies (1997-2003); BT Group (2003-2008); Alcatel-Lucent (2008-2013)
- Political party: People's Party for Freedom and Democracy
- Spouse: Helena
- Children: 2
- Awards: Officier in de Orde van Oranje Nassau (Netherlands); Honorary Knight Commander of the Order of the British Empire KBE (United Kingdom); Legion of Honour - Knight (France)

Bernardus Johannes Maria "Ben" Verwaayen KBE (born 11 February 1952) is a Dutch businessman and a general partner of Keen Venture Partners. He was Chief Executive Officer of the telecommunications company Alcatel-Lucent from 2008 to 2013.

== Early life ==
Verwaayen is the fifth of six children born to a family who owned a chemicals business in Driebergen. At school, he organised the first student parliament, and after graduating from Utrecht University with a degree in law and international relations in 1975, wanted to be a journalist or politician.

== Career ==
After graduating from Utrect University, Verwaayen joined the Royal Netherlands Army, where he founded the Algemene Vereniging Nederlandse Militairen (General Association of Dutch soldiers), a union that existed until 1996.

On leaving the army, to enable him to continue his work with the trade union, he joined a subsidiary of ITT Corporation because it gave him time to sit on a Dutch state committee to reform the army. His first promotion came after he went to the European Union Parliament in Brussels to protest about the company's alleged role in the overthrow of Salvador Allende's government in Chile; ITT responded by making him its Netherlands public relations chief.

In 1988, Verwaayen became a director of PTT Telecom, the state-owned Dutch telecoms group that was a forerunner of today's KPN; and then was appointed a board member of Lucent Technologies in 1997, moving to the United States. A committed Anglophile, he became CEO of BT in 2003. During his time there, he was also a board member for Dutch television production company Endemol, and chaired the Confederation of British Industry committee on climate change. There was controversy over his management style at BT, with accusations that BT Global Services had to write down substantial losses and that Verwaayen was to blame.

After standing down from BT on 1 June 2008 when Ian Livingston took over, there was speculation that he would pursue a career in Dutch politics. On 2 September 2008 the Alcatel-Lucent board of directors appointed Verwaayen as the company's chief executive officer, succeeding Patricia Russo. In March 2009, he forwent a €520,000 cash bonus after a pay freeze had been imposed on staff and a loss-making 2008. He was less restrained in later years; his salary increased by 30% between 2010 and 2012, even as losses continued at the company.

On 22 February 2013 the Alcatel-Lucent board of directors appointed Michel Combes as the company's CEO, succeeding Verwaayen, effective 1 April. He joined Akamai Technologies as a director in November 2013.

In 2016, Verwaayen founded Keen Venture Partners, a venture capital firm providing early growth capital for technology companies. Since April 2020, he has been Chairman of Renewi plc.

=== Politics ===
During his military service, Verwaayen founded the Algemene Vereniging Nederlandse Militairen (General Association of Dutch soldiers), a union that existed until 1996.

Verwaayen has been a longtime member of the People's Party for Freedom and Democracy. He sat in its executive for ten years, and also contributed to its election programme for the 2006 Dutch elections. At various times, he was linked with a Cabinet position. The former Dutch Prime Minister, Mark Rutte, has named him as one of his closest advisors.

=== Honours ===
Verwaayen has received various honorary awards and has been made Officier in de Orde van Oranje Nassau (Netherlands), Honorary Knight Commander of the Order of the British Empire KBE (United Kingdom), and a knight in the Legion of Honour (France).

== Personal life ==
Married to Helena, the couple have two children. They currently reside in Paris, but had a family home in Haslemere, Surrey where Verwaayen hosted a party in summer 2008, attended by 1,300 guests including former Vodafone CEO Arun Sarin, UK government ministers Stephen Twigg and John Denham. Verwaayen, a tennis player himself, put on a celebrity tennis match between John Lloyd and Ilie Năstase, and is also a fan of Arsenal F.C.

== See also ==
- Legion of Honour
- List of Legion of Honour recipients by name (V)
- List of foreign recipients of the Legion of Honour by country
