= Michel Combes =

French businessman

- Born: 29 March 1962 (age 64); Boulogne-Billancourt, France
- Education: École Polytechnique; Télécom ParisTech; Paris Dauphine University; Conservatoire national des arts et métiers
- Occupation: CEO
- Employer(s): France Telecom (2003–2006); Vodafone (2008–2012); Alcatel-Lucent (2013–2015); Altice (2015–2017); Sprint (2018–2020); SoftBank Group International (2022–2025); Lambda (2026–present)

Michel Combes (born 29 March 1962) is a French businessman and Chief Executive Officer (CEO) of Lambda, an AI infrastructure and GPU cloud company. Previously, he was CEO of SoftBank Group International, Sprint, and has held CEO roles at Vodafone Europe, Alcatel-Lucent and Altice.

== Early life and education ==
Combes was born on 29 March 1962. He attended the Lycée Louis-le-Grand in Paris, then graduated from École Polytechnique in 1983, Télécom ParisTech, Paris Dauphine University and Conservatoire national des arts et métiers (Cnam).

== Career ==
After holding several positions at ministries, France Télécom and TDF, Combes was CEO of Vodafone Europe from 2008 to 2012.

On 22 February 2013 the Alcatel-Lucent board of directors appointed Combes as the company's CEO, succeeding Ben Verwaayen (effective April 1). On 19 June 2013 Combes announced plans to focus Alcatel-Lucent's operations on networking products and high-speed broadband in order to cut costs by 1 billion euros by 2015. He left Alcatel-Lucent in September 2015, after Nokia announced its intention to buy the company but before the merger was complete, to join Altice as COO. He became Altice's CEO in 2016, and resigned in November 2017.

Combes was appointed as the CFO of Sprint in January 2018, and CEO in May of the same year. His tenure ceased when Sprint merged with T-Mobile US in April 2020.

Following Sprint, Combes joined SoftBank Group International as President in April 2020 and was appointed CEO on 28 January 2022, where he oversaw SBGI's operating and investment portfolios, including the SoftBank LatAm Funds. He served on several boards of directors of SoftBank portfolio companies, including WeWork, Cybereason, Contentsquare, Jellysmack, Kavak, OneWeb, Sorare, Swile, TelevisaUnivision and Vestiaire Collective.

In 2026, Combes was appointed CEO of Lambda, an AI infrastructure company and GPU cloud provider. He joined co-founder and CTO Stephen Balaban, who continues to lead the company's technical direction.

== Personal life ==
Combes is married to Christie Julien, an acclaimed French concert pianist. Combes has three children.

Business positions
Preceded by Ben Verwaayen	CEO of Alcatel-Lucent; 2013–2015	Succeeded by Philippe Camus
Preceded by Patrick Drahi	CEO of Altice; 2015–2017	Succeeded by Alain Weill
Preceded by Marcelo Claure	CEO of Sprint; 2018–2020	Succeeded by Merged with T-Mobile US
Preceded by Founder-led	CEO of Lambda; 2025–present	Succeeded by incumbent
