= Ted Dangelmayer =

American writer (born 1947)

George Theodore Dangelmayer
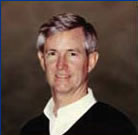
- Ted Dangelmayer
- Born: May 18, 1947 (age 79); Cambridge, Massachusetts
- Occupation: ESD Consultant
- Writing career
- Period: 1978 to the present
- Genre: non-fiction
- Subject: ESD Control
- Website: dangelmayer.com

Ted Dangelmayer (born May 18, 1947, Cambridge, MA), who writes under the name 'G. Theodore Dangelmayer' has written two editions the book ESD Program Management: A Realistic Approach to Continuous Measurable Improvement in Static Control.

== Biography ==
Ted Dangelmayer is president and CEO of Dangelmayer Associates, L.L.C. and has been developing ESD programs since 1978 for large global corporations as well as individual proprietorships.

He is a NARTE Certified Engineer and holds 3 US Patents. He earned his B.S.E.E. from the University of Maine. He is published in several trade magazines and the EOS/ESD Symposium and is a recipient of the Outstanding Contributor Award. Past responsibilities with the Association include President in 1988 and 1989, Standards Chairman in 1986 and 1987, General Chairman of the 1990 EOS/ESD Symposium and Chairman of the 1991 Symposium Board of Directors.

He retired from Lucent Technologies in 2001 as a Consulting Member of the Technical Staff. Under his leadership, Lucent Technologies - North Andover, MA, was the first site in the USA to become S20.20 certified. At the time, the Lucent site had 2,000,000 square feet (190,000 m^{2}) of floor space and 12,000 employees.

He then became Director of Technology and Program Design for the Professional Services Division of Ion Systems in Berkeley, CA from 2001 - 2002. He has held leadership positions such as Chairman of the Lucent Global ESD Leadership Team, President of the International ESD Association, Chairman of the ANSI/ESDA Standards Committee, and General Chairman of the EOS/ESD Symposium.

He completed the ESD Association ANSI/ESDA S20.20 Course for Program Managers and Consultants. He has published magazine articles, technical papers and two editions of the book ESD Program Management.

He is currently President of the Northeast Chapter of the ESD Association and a member of the ESD Association International Council of Education, 2003 Technical Program Committee, human resource committee and is the chairman of the ESDA Corporate Sponsorship Programs.

== Published works ==
- ESD Program Management: A Realistic Approach to Continuous Measurable Improvement in Static Control, by Danglemayer, G. Theodore, Hardcover, 356 p, ISBN 0-412-09781-8 or ISBN 978-0-412-09781-2, Publisher: Kluwer Academic Print on Demand, Published Date: 11/01/1990 with ISBN 0-442-23794-4 and 1996 with ISBN 978-0-412-09781-2
- ESD Program Management: A Realistic Approach to Continuous Measurable Improvement in Static Control, by Danglemayer, G. Theodore, Series: The International Series in Engineering and Computer Science, Vol. 489, 2nd ed., 1999, 512 p., Hardcover, ISBN 978-0-412-13671-9, Publisher: Kluwer Academic Pub, Published Date: 01/01/1999
- Strategic and Economic Benefits of an ESD Program, by Ted Dangelmayer, Compliance Engineering , 2004
- ESD Packaging Considerations, by Ted Dangelmayer, Compliance Engineering, , 2004
- Critical Factors in ESD Program Management, by Ted Dangelmayer, Compliance Engineering, September/October 2002
- ESD: See It! Believe It! Control It! Video instructional material, Automated Learning,
