= Paradyne =

US telecommunications company

Paradyne Networks, Inc.
- Formerly: Paradyne Corporation (1969-1989); AT&T Paradyne (1989-1996); Paradyne Networks, Inc. (1996-2005)
- Industry: Telecommunications
- Founded: 1969; 57 years ago
- Defunct: 2005
- Fate: Acquired by Zhone Technologies
- Headquarters: Largo, Florida
- Website: paradyne.com at the Wayback Machine (archived 2004-06-23)

Logo of AT&T Paradyne

Paradyne Networks, Inc. was a manufacturer of telecommunications hardware, based in Largo, Florida. The company formed in 1969 as Paradyne Corporation to supply computer communications systems and expanded steadily through the 1970s and 80s. During these period it operated in the high-end modem market and competed with Motorola Codex, Racal-Milgo, and divisions of AT&T and IBM.

As one of its first major purchases after the 1982 Breakup of the Bell System, AT&T purchased the company for $250 million in 1989 and renamed it to AT&T Paradyne. The company grew to become a major supplier in the digital subscriber line (DSL) industry as that expanded. When AT&T spun off Lucent in 1996, Paradyne moved to the new company. Lucent quickly sold Paradyne to Texas Pacific Group (TPG Capital) for $175 million where it became Paradyne Networks, Inc..

Net to Net Technologies was acquired by Paradyne in 2004

In 2004, Paradyne acquired Net to Net Technologies.

The company was acquired by Zhone Technologies in 2005 for US$183.6 million.
