= Reading Works =

- Industry: Electronics Manufacturing
- Predecessor: Gray and Barton; Western Electric Manufacturing Co.
- Founded: 1876; 150 years ago
- Founder: Elisha Gray
- Fate: Closed in 2003
- Headquarters: Berks County, Pennsylvania, United States
- Owner: Western Electric (1952–1984); AT&T Technologies (1984–1996); Lucent Technologies (1996–2000); Agere Systems (2000–2005)
- Number of employees: 5,000 (1985)

Western Electric's Reading Works in Berks County, Pennsylvania, was a manufacturer of integrated circuit and optoelectronic equipment for communication and computing. The work force grew to nearly 5,000 by 1985 making the Reading, Pennsylvania, facility one of Berks County's largest industrial employers. As a part of Western Electric and the Bell System, it changed its masthead many times during its life.

== 1952: From Allentown to Laureldale ==
The origins of Western Electric can be traced back to 1876 when Elisha Gray lost the race to invent the telephone. Alexander Graham Bell submitted a patent application just hours before Gray filed his own. Despite this setback, Gray left a lasting impact on the telephone industry in 1869 by founding Gray and Barton, a small manufacturing firm in Cleveland, Ohio, with Enos N. Barton. By 1872, the firm had moved to Chicago and was renamed the Western Electric Manufacturing Co. By 1880, Western Electric had grown to become the largest electrical manufacturing company in the United States. In 1881, the rapid expansion of the telephone network outpaced smaller suppliers, leading American Bell to purchase a controlling interest in Western Electric Company (WECO), appointing it as the exclusive manufacturer for Bell telephone companies. Western Electric was tasked not only with manufacturing but also with developing Bell equipment. In 1907, Theodore N. Vail merged the engineering departments of AT&T and Western Electric, creating Bell Labs in 1925. Western Electric subsequently became the manufacturing division of the Bell System.

In 1951, just four years after Bell Laboratories invented the transistor, Western Electric opened the Allentown Plant to produce the first transistors. Under the leadership of Jack Morton, tasked with developing transistors for mass production, Western Electric established branch labs at several plants. These labs, staffed by Bell Labs scientists and engineers, focused on production engineering and maintained close collaboration with Bell Labs headquarters in Murray Hill. Morton refined this innovative approach at the Allentown Plant, which produced electronic devices and components for the Bell System, and placed Eugene Anderson in charge of the Bell Labs semiconductor development group at the site.

In 1952, operations in Reading began when Western Electric converted an old Rosedale knitting mill in Laureldale into a factory for producing electronic components for the U.S. government, particularly for military and space applications. On August 22, 1952, Western Electric opened its new electronics manufacturing facility in Laureldale. Growth was initially modest but steady. By the end of 1952, the factory employed 130 workers, and this number grew to 253 by the end of 1953.

On January 12, 1956, a diffused base transistor was unveiled at Laureldale before top military brass at a solid-state diffusion symposium. That was the same year that Bell Labs' scientists Bardeen, Brattain, and Shockley received the 1956 Nobel Prize in physics for the invention of the transistor. "Bell Laboratories scientists in Murray Hill, N.J., may have won the Nobel Prizes and gotten most of the press, but Allentown and Reading delivered the goods," notes Stuart W. Leslie, a historian of science at Johns Hopkins University in Baltimore.

In 1958, a group of Bell Laboratories scientists moved to Reading, Pennsylvania, from other locations and started the Laureldale Laboratory in the Laureldale Western Electric Plant. Bell Labs was a division of Western Electric. Initially the Laureldale Laboratory designed electron tubes (vacuum tubes). Eventually, after becoming the Reading Laboratory, it designed semiconductor devices which eventually included integrated circuits, light emitting diodes, and lasers.

== 1962: From Laureldale to Reading ==
By the late 1950s, the increased demand for its products necessitated Western Electric building a larger facility, so plans were developed for a 200,000-square-foot (20,000 m^{2}) building at the North 11th Street site. The Greater Berks Development Fund built the Reading plant at the end of 11th street for $2 million to lease to Bell Labs and Western Electric.

Ground breaking took place in November 1960, and on January 2, 1962, Western Electric took possession of the new building, Building 30 (the manufacturing building).

In 1964, Western Electric bought the 290,000-square-foot (27,000 m^{2}) building. By 1966 all facilities had moved from the Laureldale plant to the Muhlenberg Township, Pennsylvania, site. The new facility was called the Reading Works and the branch of Bell Labs was called the Reading Labs.

In 1967, when the Reading Works celebrated its 15th anniversary in Berks County, it employed about 2,600 employees. Various additions since the mid-1960s increased the manufacturing space to 1,300,000 square feet (120,000 m^{2}). Construction on the 210,000-square-foot (20,000 m^{2}) office building (Building 20) began in 1980, and the building was first occupied in 1982.

== 1984: Western Electric to AT&T Technologies ==
In 1984, the Bell System broke up into the various Baby Bell operating companies and AT&T. As a result of this divestiture in 1984, the Western Electric plant became an AT&T Technology Systems location as part of AT&T, supplying devices for use in the former Bell System's network. By 1984, employment had reached what would be an all-time high of 4,900. In 1988, microchip and fiber-optic component manufacturing was combined into an AT&T organization called AT&T Microelectronics. In 1989 the AT&T work force nationwide was 297,000 and while employment at the Reading Works was 3,200. In 1992, the Reading Works of AT&T Microelectronics had 3,300 workers and provided an annual payroll of $100 million. The product mix included lightwave components, linear bipolar integrated circuits, high voltage integrated circuits, high speed silicon integrated circuits, and gallium arsenide integrated circuits. A satellite manufacturing building, Building 10, was constructed on North 13th Street, just north of the General Mail Facility, in 1992. The same year the Falconer building across the street was also used. AT&T Reading Works was the No. 2 employer in Berks County in 1993, but that was soon to end. In February 1994, AT&T Reading Works announced that it would be cutting 850 jobs over a 3-year period. In 1994 the Reading Works' work force was reduced from 2,929 to 2,700 with most of the cuts in the Lightwave unit. The Lightwave unit makes fiber-optic laser transmitters and receivers. In 1995 the Reading Works' work force stood at 2,400 including AT&T Microelectronics and Bell Labs as it prepared for the spin off from AT&T into Lucent Technologies.

== 1996: AT&T to Lucent ==
Under the 1996 restructuring of AT&T, AT&T Technologies became Lucent Technologies. The Lucent Technologies' Reading, Pennsylvania, facility became both a Lucent Microelectronics and a Lucent Optoelectronics facility, designing and manufacturing optoelectronic and integrated circuit components for applications in the telecommunications and computing industries.

The Lucent Reading Plant was unique in the semiconductor industry because it manufactured both optoelectronic and integrated circuit components. The facility received a $6 million renovation to boost its optoelectronics manufacturing capacity.

In addition to serving the traditional communications markets, the Lucent Optoelectronics portion of the facility provided a family of transmitters and receivers for use in network computing applications. Lucent was also a leading player in the cable TV and hybrid fiber coaxial markets. In addition to Reading, Pennsylvania, other Lucent Optoelectronics facilities were located in Breinigsville, Pennsylvania; Murray Hill, New Jersey; Alhambra, California; and Matamoros, Mexico.

The Lucent Microelectronics portion of the facility produced linear bipolar, high voltage and gallium arsenide integrated circuits. These microchips were used in tone ringers, data processing, voltage regulators, video distribution, and in the industrial, computer, communication and instrumental markets. In addition to Reading, other Lucent Microelectronics integrated circuit sites included Allentown, Pennsylvania; Orlando, Florida; Bangkok, Thailand; Tres Cantos, Spain; and Singapore.

In 1996, the Reading Works' work force stood at 2,450 including AT&T Microelectronics and Bell Labs as it made the transition from AT&T into Lucent Technologies. The spin off of AT&T manufacturing units as Lucent Technologies became necessary as these units increasingly found that their prospective customers were AT&T competitors. The divestiture of the manufacturing units made them suppliers rather than competitors, opening up new markets to Lucent and to the Reading Works. At the same time it caused the anxiety that comes with change. On October 1, 1996, Lucent Technologies became independent of AT&T. The Reading Works became Lucent Technologies Reading Facility. It employed 2,177 people, down considerably from 4,900 in 1985. By the end of 1997, the Reading Facility workforce had declined and remained stable at 2,000. By the end of 1998, the Reading Facility workforce had rebounded to 2,177. In 1999 a pickup in Lightwave business caused expansion of both the Reading Facility and the Breinigsville plant.

== 2000: Lucent to Agere ==
The Reading Plant's heritage, combined with constant innovation and product quality, positioned the Reading site as one of the largest semiconductor facilities in the world. In 2000, Lucent Microelectronics and Optoelectronics were reorganized as Agere Systems with the intention of spinning it off as an independent company. Agere Systems produced high-tech components such as opto-electronics products, which use lightwave technologies to transmit information, and integrated circuits, which are miniaturized chips used in computers and communications. The opto-electronics parts were used in systems such as submarine communication cables, cable transmitters, cable receivers, laser components, and network computing devices. The integrated circuits were found in a wide array of electronic products from modems and computers to cell phones and telephone offices to video equipment and digital television. After becoming Agere Systems, by the end of 2000, the Reading Facility became the Muhlenberg plant and had grown its workforce by 800 to 3,000 as the anticipated lightwave business materialized. In 2001, Agere Systems' stock went public in late March. The spin-off was completed on June 1, 2002. By mid-2001, Agere cut 508 jobs at the Reading Works. These layoffs continued in waves as conditions in the semiconductor market deteriorated and by the end of the year Muhlenberg had a workforce of only 1,546.

== 2003: From Agere to Closure ==
On January 24, 2002, Agere Systems announced that it would be closing the 1,300,000 square feet (120,000 m^{2}) Reading Works in 12 to 18 months. The planned changes involved closing the Breinigsville, Pennsylvania plant in Lehigh County, Pennsylvania, which was opened in 1988; selling the Orlando plant in Florida; and consolidating several locations in New Jersey. All operations were consolidated at the Allentown, Pennsylvania, headquarters location and the New Jersey locations. About 1,500 workers were transferred from Reading to Allentown where 3,200 workers were employed prior to the relocation. As Agere was leaving, Legerity, Inc. assumed some of the operations formerly done by the Muhlenberg plant in the old Building 10 on North 13th Street. In this facility Legerity assembled 40 former Agere circuit-design, physical-design, application-design and process development engineers to support the analog line card integrated circuit business it purchased from Agere. Legerity is a design facility that uses other companies foundries to manufacture its products. In May 2003, Agere Systems ended all manufacturing and began decommissioning its Muhlenberg plant. The last 346 manufacturing employees were laid off. About 50 employees — mostly maintenance — remained at the plant until a buyer was found.

Agere built a $165 million World Headquarters building in Hanover Township, Lehigh County, Pennsylvania. This building was started in 2001 and completed in 2003. It brought together research and development facilities from Breinigsville and Muhlenberg. It absorbed about 2,000 workers from these two facilities. Agere Systems tried unsuccessfully to sell its Union Boulevard plant in Allentown, where the first commercial production line for transistors was set up in 1951. Agere Systems demolished the manufacturing part of the Union Boulevard facility. The company continues to use the offices and wet labs in the remaining part of the building. Its headquarters building is nearby in Hanover Township, Pennsylvania. In 2003, Agere Systems sold the chip plant and research center in Breinigsville to TriQuint Semiconductor, which also bought the company's fiber-optic components division. The facility, now under different ownership, is a multi-tenant technology park.

At the end of 1999, shares of Lucent stock hit a high of nearly $80. After spinning off Agere Systems, Lucent shares dropped to around $4.50 and later dropped to $0.55 in October 2002. After being spun off, Agere shares were about $4 and dropped to a low of $0.50 in October 2002. Agere started 2000 with 18,000 employees. By the end of the year it had only 10,000 employees. By the end of 2001 the number of employees had dropped to about 7,000. The last wafer starts at the Reading Works were scheduled for April, 2003 and the last shipments were scheduled for May, 2003. The doors locked on May 16, 2003. Starting May 17, the Reading work force consisted of 100 employees who cleaned up the facility and disposed of equipment. In July the work force was down to 50 maintenance employees who manned the 1,300,000-square-foot (120,000 m^{2}) facility while attempts were made to sell or at least rent or lease it. On December 13, 2005, it was announced that Agere had signed an agreement with a Montgomery County, Pennsylvania developer to sell the 133-acre (0.5 km^{2}) Agere Systems property in Muhlenberg Township, Pennsylvania, and projected the return of 1,000 jobs to the site within 18 months, with more jobs to follow.

== 2006: Greater Reading Expo Center ==
Audubon Land Development of Oaks, Pennsylvania, bought the old Reading Works in December 2005 for an undisclosed amount. Agere Systems had been asking for $8 million for the property. The assessment of the property was lowered to $9.5 million from $26.3 million after Agere Systems appealed. On Tuesday, March 14, 2006, Urban Expositions, a Georgia-based trade show company, announced it would hold the 10th annual Philadelphia Gift Show at the Reading Center July 23–26, 2006, the facility being called the Greater Reading Expo Center. A company press release called the event, with an expected 1,400 booths, the largest regional gift show in the country. Gene Call, an Audubon spokesman, said Audubon's subsidiary, Stonepoint Management Corp., which was leasing the 1,000,000-square-foot (93,000 m^{2}) Agere Systems building, would run the expo center. Stonepoint would use 350,000 square feet (33,000 m^{2}), he said. Stonepoint was exploring other uses but had not made firm plans.

Crystal Seitz, president of the Greater Reading Convention & Visitors Bureau, said a typical convention center with a steady stream of shows generates about $150 million for a local economy, including money spent for lodging and meals. Jon C. Scott, president of the Berks Economic Partnership, said he has met several times with Audubon officials and was excited about the prospects for the center. "It opens up the type of exhibits that would never have been available before," Scott said. "It leads to other intriguing possibilities." Some of the shows scheduled for the facility included: Philadelphia Gift Show which includes Birdwatch America-Philadelphia, Great Train Expo, Bead Fest Philadelphia, Greater Philadelphia Pet Expo, Great American Guitar Show, Sports Card & Memorabilia Show, Home & Garden Show, and The Greater Reading Sport, Travel & Outdoors Show.

Success of the Expo Center was in part due to the closing of the Fort Washington Exposition Center in Montgomery County and the Pennsylvania Expo Center in Lehigh County and in part due to the 250,000 square feet (23,000 m^{2}) of inside space, several auditoriums, numerous meeting rooms, 13 loading docks, ample parking and a full-service cafeteria among its amenities. Muhlenberg Township waived the 10% amusement tax on admission to the Expo Center from January through September 2007. This was an attempt to allow the Expo Center to become better established. The township estimated future revenues at $50,000 per year.

The Pennsylvania Department of Community and Economic Development included the StonePointe Center, which includes the Greater Reading Expo Center, as part of the Greater Reading Keystone Innovation Zone and invested $235,000 to fund its operations. Also included in this zone is TEK Park, the former home of Lucent/Agere Optoelectronics in Breinigsville, Lehigh County, which houses a number of industrial tenants and the Kutztown University Innovation Center. Building 30 is now called the "Flex Building" and building 20 is the "Office Building". Stonepoint pitched the center: "Imagine a state of the art business center, with more than one million square feet of available space for office, manufacturing and distribution; a facility with high-tech infrastructure and easy access to transportation. Imagine a convenient location near Reading, Pennsylvania, with professional on-site management to support your business. Imagine your business at StonePointe Center."

The Expo Center was the latest in venues that mark a renaissance in Reading. It started with the opening of the Sovereign Center and its sister the Sovereign Performing Arts Center. Now it includes the GoggleWorks Center for the Arts.

The Greater Reading Expo Center closed in 2013.
