= Motive, Inc =

- Company type: Acquired by Alcatel-Lucent
- Industry: Software
- Founded: 1997
- Headquarters: Austin, Texas, United States
- Key people: Alfred Mockett, Chairman & CEO
- Products: Broadband management software
- Revenue: US$97 million (2004)
- Number of employees: ~300 (2007)
- Website: www.motive.com

Motive, Inc (previously Motive Communications) was a provider of service management software for broadband and mobile data services, founded in 1997 and headquartered in Austin, Texas. The company was acquired by Alcatel-Lucent in 2008, which was in turn acquired by Nokia in 2016.

The Motive brand was revived in 2024 by Lumine Group, after it bought Nokia's device management business unit.

== Products ==
Companies worldwide used Motive software in their online services. Motive-powered e-service networks were being used in the online economy by companies as diverse as Compaq, Dell, EDS, Gateway, Hewlett-Packard, Intuit, Kmart, Merrill Lynch, Norwest, Oracle, Peregrine, and Target.

The acquisition extended Alcatel-Lucent and Motive's profitable three-year partnership. Both companies developed and sold remote management software for automating the installation, setup, and maintenance of residential gateways for home networking. There were already more than 40 joint customers amongst Alcatel-Lucent and Motive, including AT&T, Verizon, BT, Vodafone Portugal, and Swisscom.

== Timeline ==
May 1997: Company founded by Scott Harmon, Scott Abel, Mike Maples Jr, Brian Vetter, Tom Bereiter

July, 1998: Releases its first product, signs Hewlett-Packard Co. as its first major customer.

Dec, 1999: Spins off all.com

2000–2003: Acquires three other Austin companies (Ventix, Question.com, BroadJump); merges with All.com.

June 25, 2004: Initial public offering; shares rise 1.5 percent to $10.15.

Oct. 27, 2005: Restates earnings for first and second quarters of 2005; cuts one-third of work force.

Nov. 14, 2005: Announces informal SEC inquiry into restatement of results (linked to revenue from resellers) and stock sales by certain executives.

Jan. 20, 2006: Paul Baker resigns as chief financial officer.

Jan. 23, 2006: Receives extension to report fourth-quarter results.

Feb. 21, 2006: Chairman and CEO Scott Harmon resigns.

Apr. 10, 2006: Motive delisted by NASDAQ.

Oct. 24, 2006: Mike Fitzpatrick named CFO.

Jan. 16, 2007: Receives a cash infusion from Elion, a telecommunications provider in Estonia.

Apr. 12, 2007: SEC inquiry becomes a formal investigation.

On June 17, 2008, Alcatel-Lucent announced that it had entered into a definitive agreement to acquire Motive Inc. through a cash tender offer for all outstanding Motive shares at a price of US$2.23 per share, representing a value of approximately $67.8 million.

== Revival of the brand ==
In December 2023, Nokia announced that it had reached an agreement to carve out its device management unit (representing the former Motive, Inc. business) and its service management unit (acquired in 2015 from Mformation). The purchaser was Lumine Group, a Toronto-based holder of a portfolio of software businesses in communications and media. The deal, valued at €185 million and involving the transfer of around 500 employees, completed in April 2024. Lumine revived the Motive brand for its new stand-alone device management and service management business.
