= Optelian =

North American networking equipment company

Optelian Access Networks Corporation
- Company type: Private
- Industry: Telecommunications
- Founded: 2002
- Defunct: 2021
- Fate: Acquired by DZS
- Headquarters: Ottawa, Ontario; Marietta, Georgia
- Key people: David Weymouth (CEO); Mike Perry (President)
- Divisions: Versawave
- Website: optelian.com at the Wayback Machine (archived 2020-04-26)

Optelian Access Networks Corporation was a telecommunications company founded in 2002. Optelian has two headquarters – one in Ottawa, Ontario (Canada) and the other in Marietta, Georgia (U.S.). The company has both product development and local manufacturing based in Ottawa. Initially producing passive networking components, Optelian has added active products for service providers, wireless applications, utilities, research and education, cloud and data center, or any other enterprise.

== History ==
In 2002, Dave Weymouth and Mike Perry founded Optelian after realizing that there was a gap they could fill in the optical transport market. The company began creating passive optical components, and then expanded to active solutions, including packet optical networking, based on customer feedback.

Optelian now designs and develops optical transport network components for over 200 service providers, utilities, research and development, data center and cloud, and other enterprises in North America and around the world. Optelian has delivered more than 20,000 systems with over 300,000 wavelengths installed.

In January 2012, Optelian acquired Versawave Technologies Inc., of Vancouver, British Columbia, a leader in the field of ultra-high bandwidth gallium arsenide based optical modulators with patented polarization modulation technology.

On February 08, 2021, DZS completed its acquisition of Optelian, less than a month after the announcement that DZS had entered into a definitive agreement to acquire Optelian on January 20, 2021.
