= Henry Schacht =

American businessman

- Born: October 16, 1934 (age 90); Erie, Pennsylvania, U.S.
- Education: Yale University (BS); Harvard University (MBA)

Henry Schacht (born October 16, 1934) is an American businessman, a former chairman and chief executive officer of Cummins Diesel (1973–1994), and later CEO of Lucent Technologies.

Previously he was on the boards of CBS, Chase Manhattan, and Alcoa.

He assumed the Lucent CEO role in a transitory capacity upon Lucent's spinoff from AT&T Corporation, and served from 1995 to 1997. Mr. Schacht was brought back in 2001 to replace Richard McGinn, who had served as Lucent's CEO during the intervening years. He is currently the managing director and senior advisor of the private equity firm Warburg Pincus LLC New York.

Schacht was a member of both the American Philosophical Society and the American Academy of Arts and Sciences.

== Sources ==
- "Lucent Technologies' Board of Directors names Henry Schacht Chairman and CEO". Lucent Technologies. October 23, 2000. Archived from the original on August 23, 2006.
