= OpenPlug =

French software company

- Type: Subsidiary of Alcatel-Lucent
- Industry: Software
- Founded: 2002
- Headquarters: Sophia Antipolis, France
- Key people: Eric Baissus CEO
- Products: Mobile applications development tools, software for mobile phones.
- Revenue: €2.749 million (2008)
- Number of employees: 39
- Website: www.openplug.com

OpenPlug was a French company focused on mobile applications development tools and software for mobile phones. The company was founded in August 2002 by Eric Baissus and David Lamy-Charrier. Before OpenPlug, they were in charge of the reference software solution for Texas Instruments 2G and 2.5 product lines.

Alcatel-Lucent announced it had acquired OpenPlug on September 1, 2010.

OpenPlug has developed several mobile software technology products and development tools aimed at mobile phone OEMs, ODMs and chipset vendors as well as mobile application developers. OpenPlug also provided professional services in the above areas.

== Products ==
ELIPS Studio is a cross-platform development environment (SDK) for native mobile handset device applications. ELIPS Studio is provided as plugin to Adobe Systems’ Flex Builder IDE that allows compilation of Applications developed in Actionscript and MXML using Adobe’s Flex framework into native code and installable application packages for iPhone, Android, Windows Mobile and Symbian devices. It also offers Actionscript APIs for accessing a smartphone’s on-device features and extra APIs for displaying native GUI widgets. ELIPS Studio was first unveiled at the Mobile World Congress exhibition in February 2009 and its beta programme was started at the Adobe MAX event in October 2009. ELIPS Studio is available as a commercial product since August 2010.

ELIPS Stack is a 3G cellular telephony stack designed to be integrated into Linux-based mobile devices, such as Mobile Internet Devices (MIDs), smartphones and netbooks. It includes all the middleware necessary for telephony applications and User Interface to make use of a 3G radio modem, such as: voice call, video call, SMS, MMS. It includes a 3G-324M video call stack from ENEA AB. A smartphone reference design based on Intel’s Moorestown processor with the moblin OS and including ELIPS Stack has been shown at the CES 2010 show by Aavamobile.

ELIPS Suite is a Man-Machine Interface (MMI) software stack implementing a reference User Interface and middleware for 2G and 3G feature phones. It also integrates a range of optional 3rd-party modules such as: Java ME JVM from Myriad Group (formerly Esmertec), WAP browser and MMS stack from Comviva (formerly Jataayu Software), predictive text input method engine and complex script renderer from Nuance Communications (following acquisitions of Zi Corp and nCore), SyncML stack from Sybase iAnywhere, OMA DRM from Safenet (following the acquisition of BeepScience), amongst others. ELIPS Suite is supplied with an SDK plugin for Microsoft Visual Studio that includes a mobile phone simulator. The ELIPS Suite SDK exposes C APIs like POSIX and Gtk and provides an application framework that enforces a component-based software development model optimized for the memory and CPU constraints of mobile phones. ELIPS Suite has been ported to several ARM architecture mobile phone processors from vendors like ST-Ericsson (formerly Philips NXP Semiconductors) and Texas Instruments. ELIPS Suite has been used to create the SonyEricsson J132 mobile phone.

== Industry awards and alliances ==
- In 2005, OpenPlug co-founded the LiPS Forum.
- In 2006, OpenPlug appeared in the RedHerring 100 Europe list. The GSM Association also recognised OpenPlug for its component-based software technology for mobile phones with a Mobile Innovation Award.
- In 2008, OpenPlug joined the LiMo Foundation.
- In 2009, OpenPlug ranked 12th nationwide in France in the Deloitte Technology Fast50 ranking.of fast growing technology companies and received the OSEO innovation prize.
