= Alcatel-Lucent =

French global telecommunications equipment company

Alcatel-Lucent S.A.

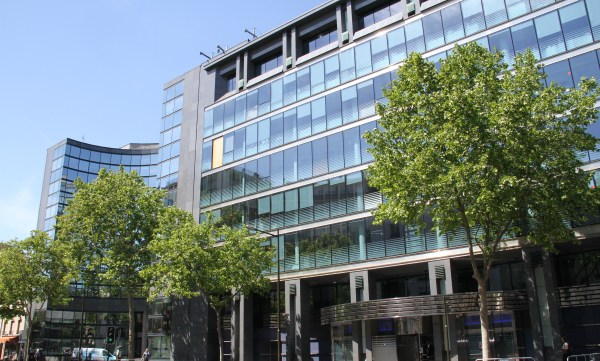
- Headquarters in Boulogne-Billancourt, France
- Type: Public
- Traded as: Euronext Paris: ALU
- Industry: Telecommunications equipment Networking equipment
- Predecessors: Alcatel SA; Lucent
- Founded: 1 December 2006; 19 years ago
- Defunct: 3 November 2016; 10 years ago
- Fate: Acquired by and merged with Nokia
- Successor: Nokia Networks (2016 acquisition); Alcatel-Lucent Enterprise (2014 spin off); Alcatel Submarine Networks
- Headquarters: Boulogne-Billancourt, France
- Area served: Worldwide
- Key people: Philippe Camus (chairman)
- Products: Hardware, software and services to telecommunications service providers and enterprises
- Website: alcatel-lucent.com at the Wayback Machine (archived 2013-02-17)

Alcatel-Lucent S.A. (French pronunciation: [alkatɛl lysɛnt]) was a multinational telecommunications equipment company, headquartered in Boulogne-Billancourt, Paris, France. The company focused on fixed, mobile and converged networking hardware, IP technologies, software and services, and operated between 2006 and 2016 in more than 130 countries.

The American company Lucent Technologies was acquired by the France-based Alcatel in 2006, after which the latter renamed itself to Alcatel-Lucent. Lucent was a successor of AT&T's Western Electric and a holding company of Bell Labs. In 2014, the Alcatel-Lucent group split into two: Alcatel-Lucent Enterprise, providing enterprise communication services, and Alcatel-Lucent, selling to communications operators. The enterprise business was sold to China Huaxin Post and Telecom Technologies in the same year, and in 2016 Nokia acquired the remainder of Alcatel-Lucent. On 3 November 2016, Nokia completed the acquisition, retired the brand name and merged it into their Nokia Networks division. Bell Labs was maintained as an independent subsidiary of Nokia.

== History ==

Logos of Lucent Technologies and Alcatel before the merger into Alcatel-Lucent

=== Predecessor companies ===
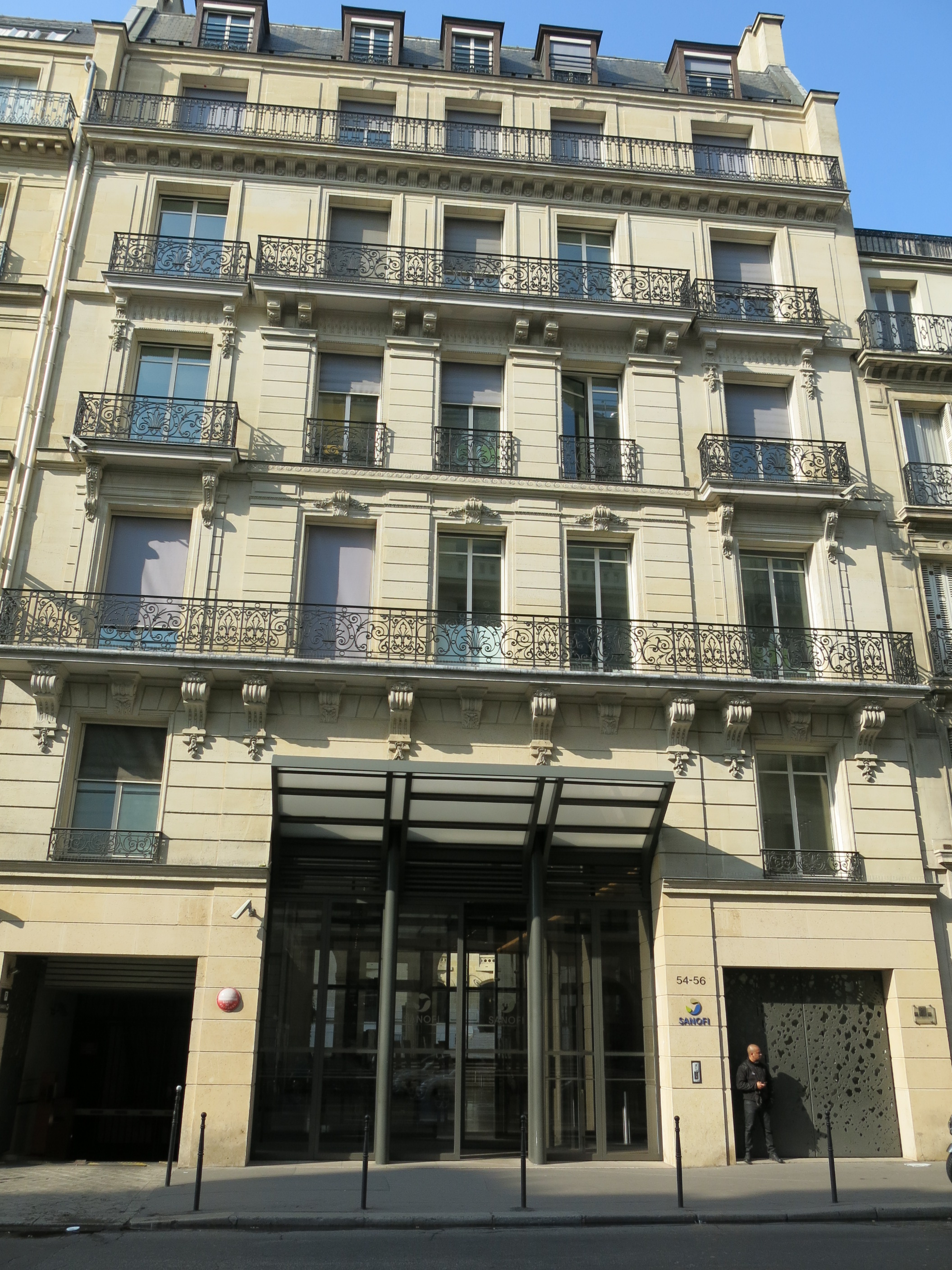
Former Alcatel-Lucent head office to 2009

Alcatel-Lucent was formed when Alcatel (originally short for the Société Alsacienne de Constructions Atomiques, de Télécommunications et d'Électronique, a small company in Mulhouse absorbed by CGE in 1966) merged with Lucent Technologies on 1 December 2006. However, the predecessors of the company have been a part of telecommunications industry since the late 19th century. The company has roots in two early telecommunications companies: La Compagnie Générale d'Électricité (CGE) and the Western Electric Manufacturing Company.

Western Electric began in 1869 when Elisha Gray and Enos N. Barton started a manufacturing firm based in Cleveland, Ohio, US. By 1880, the company had relocated to Chicago, Illinois, and become the largest electrical manufacturing company in the United States. In 1881, the American Bell Telephone Company, founded by Alexander Graham Bell and forerunner of American Telephone & Telegraph (AT&T), purchased a controlling interest in Western Electric and made it the exclusive developer and manufacturer of equipment for the Bell telephone companies.

CGE was formed in 1898 by French engineer Pierre Azaria in the Alsace region of what was then Germany and was a conglomerate involved in industries such as electricity, transportation, electronics and telecommunications. CGE would become a leader in digital communications and would also be known for building the TGV (train à grande vitesse) high-speed trains in France.

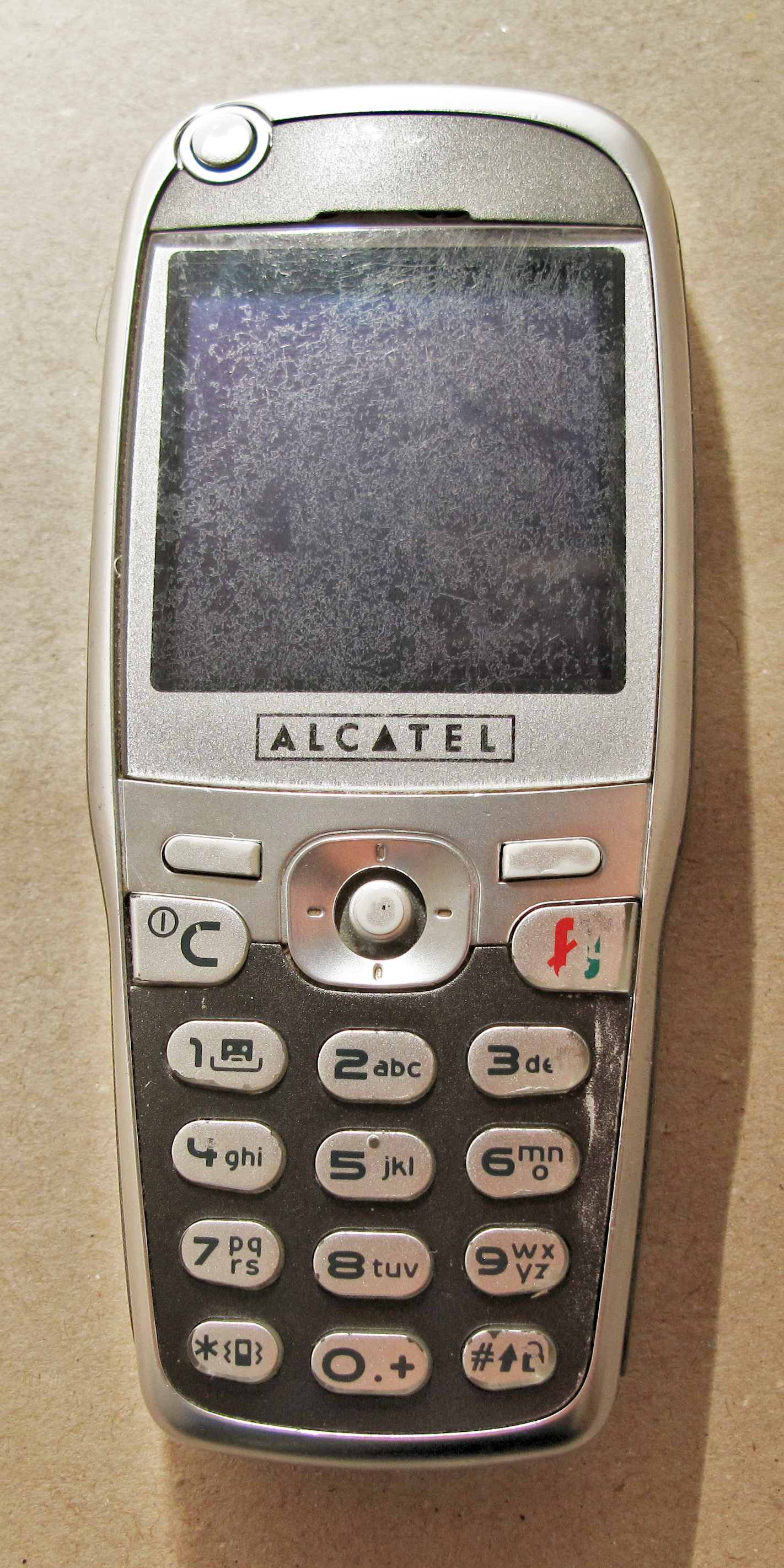
Alcatel One Touch 535, front side (introduced July 2003)

Bell Telephone Laboratories was created in 1925 from the consolidation of the R&D organizations of Western Electric and AT&T. Bell Labs would make significant scientific advances including the transistor, the laser, the solar cell, the digital signal processor chip, the Unix operating system and the cellular concept of mobile telephone service. Bell Labs researchers have won 7 Nobel Prizes.

Also in 1925, Western Electric sold its International Western Electric Company subsidiary to ITT Corporation. CGE purchased ITT's telecommunications division in the mid-1980s.

AT&T re-entered the European telecommunications market in 1984 following the Bell System divestiture. Philips promoted the venture in part because its PRX public switching technology was aging, and it sought a partner to help fund the development costs of digital switching. The joint company used the existing manufacturing and development facilities in The Hague, Hilversum, Brussels and Malmesbury as well as its U.S. resources to adapt the 5ESS system to the European market. The joint venture company AT&T & Philips Telecommunications BV doubled annual turnover between 1984 and 1987, winning major switching and transmission contracts, mainly in the effectively captive Netherlands market. In 1987, AT&T increased its holding to 60% and in 1990 it purchased the remainder of the Philips' holding.

In 1998, Alcatel Alsthom shifted its focus to the telecommunications industry, spinning off its Alsthom activities and changing the company's name to Alcatel. AT&T spun off Lucent Technologies in April 1996 with an initial public offering (IPO).

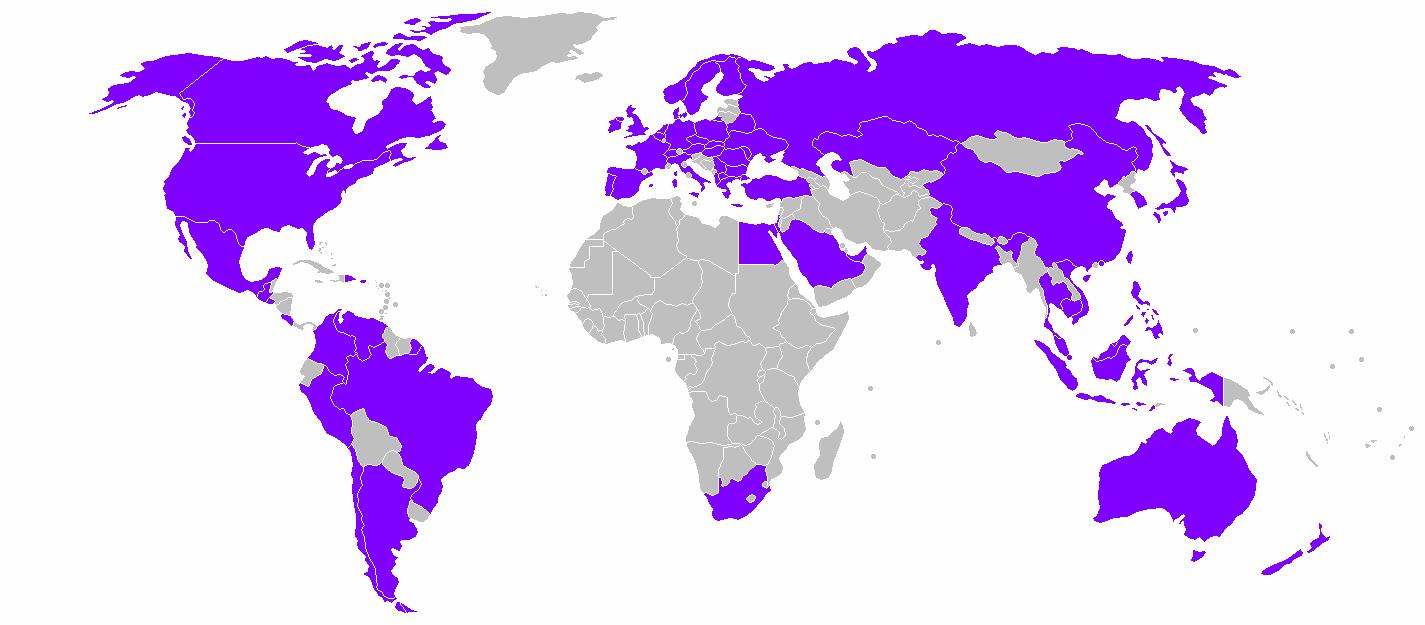
Areas served by Alcatel-Lucent in 2009

In February 2000, Alcatel acquired Canada's Newbridge Networks.

In April 2004, TCL Corporation and Alcatel announced the creation of a mobile phone manufacturing joint venture: Alcatel Mobile Phones. A year later Alcatel sold its share in the joint venture but licensed the Alcatel brand name to TCL, which continues to this day under Nokia.

In April 2006, Alcatel announced that it would swap its shares of Alcatel Alenia Space and Telespazio for €673 million and a 12.1% stake in Thales, a key player in the French defence industry. This increased Alcatel's stake in Thales to 20.8%.

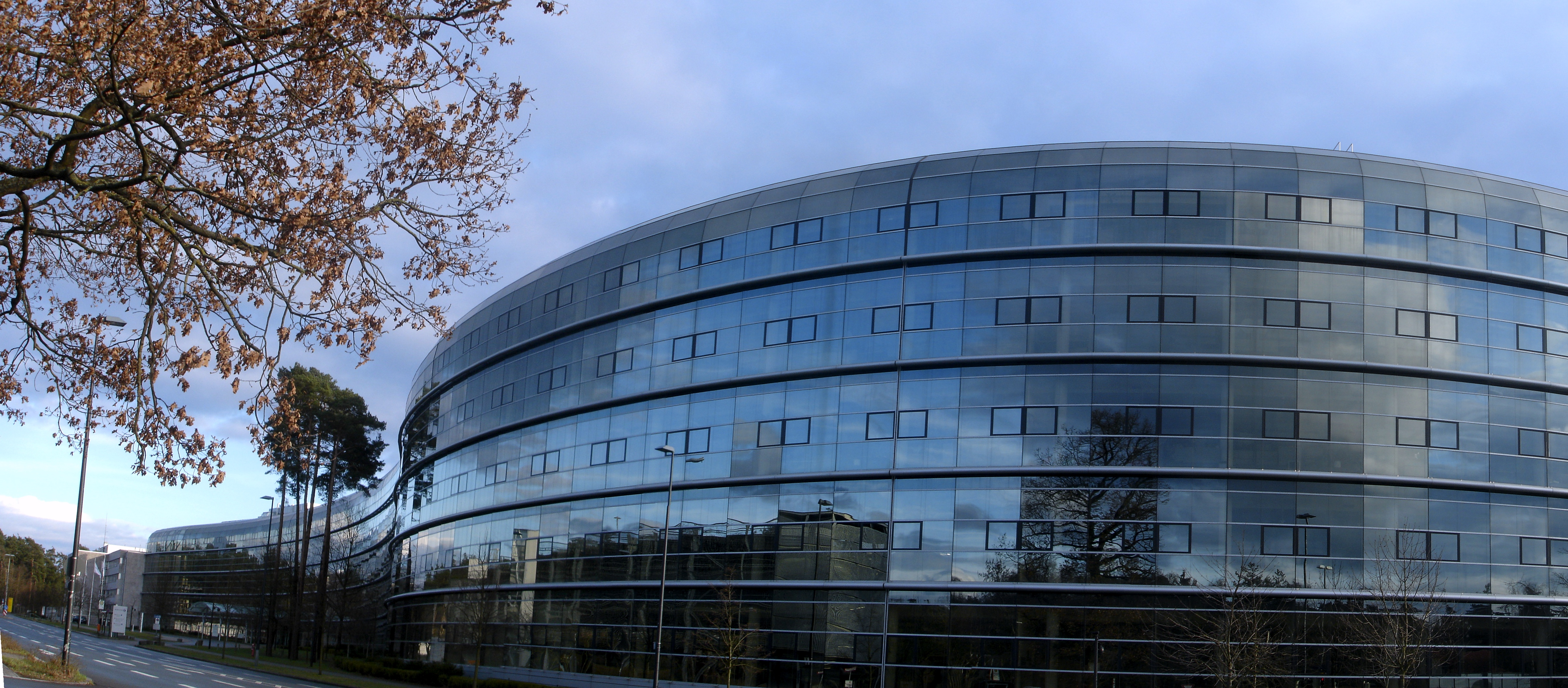
Alcatel-Lucent campus, Nuremberg, Germany

=== Creation of Alcatel-Lucent ===
Facing intense competition in the telecommunications industry, Alcatel and Lucent Technologies merged on 30 November 2006.

=== 2006–2015 ===
Alcatel-Lucent acquired Nortel's UMTS radio access business at the end of 2006. During 2007 the company acquired Canadian metro WDM networking supplier Tropic Networks, Inc.; enterprise services gateway products developer NetDevices; IPTV software company Tamblin; and the telecommunications consulting practice Thompson Advisory Group, Inc. Alcatel-Lucent had a joint venture with Dutch company Draka Holding N.V. for manufacturing optical fibre, but Draka bought out Alcatel-Lucent's 49.9% stake for €209 million in December 2007. Motive, Inc., a Texas-based provider of service management software for broadband and mobile data services, was acquired in 2008.

Ben Verwaayen was appointed as chief executive officer in September 2008 after Alcatel-Lucent's first CEO, Patricia Russo, and first chairman, Serge Tchuruk, resigned. In May 2009, Alcatel-Lucent's stake in Thales was acquired by Dassault Aviation. Alcatel-Lucent announced the acquisition of OpenPlug on 1 September 2010.

For 2010, the company had revenues of €16 billion and a reported net loss of €334 million.

In 2011, Alcatel-Lucent moved the remaining workforce and equipment from Columbus, Ohio, 6200 East Broad Street, to Dublin, Ohio, 5475 Rings Road (near Mall at Tuttle Crossing.) The former location was the Columbus Works manufacturing facility, which began in 1957 by Western Electric. During the early 2000s, the location had reduced workforce and less manufacturing needs under Lucent Technologies. Upon the merger, Alcatel-Lucent in October 2007, decided to cease productions and release additional 230 positions from the location. The decision for the move from Columbus to Dublin was from a large manufacturing facility with only 500 office employees at the office and 100 others working off-site, to a smaller 120,000 square foot two-tower building of office space for the workforce. Also, a $10 million tax incentive was provided from the State of Ohio, to assist in the relocation costs and keep the telecommunications workforce in the region. The work done at Dublin was in new-generation cell sites, 3G, 4G applications, and 4G LTE technologies.

In October 2011, Alcatel-Lucent sold its Genesys call-centre services business unit to Permira, a private equity group, for $1.5 billion—the same amount that Lucent had paid for the business in 2000. Alcatel-Lucent needed funding for the Franco-American business, which made annual losses from 2007 to 2011.

For 2011, revenues were €15 billion, with a net loss of €1.1 billion. For 2012, revenues were €14.4 billion and the net loss €1.4 billion. After seven consecutive years of negative cash flows, in October 2013 the company announced plans to cut 10,000 employees, 14% of the 72,000 workforce, as part of a €1 billion cost reduction effort.

In April 2013, Michel Combes succeeded Verwaayen as CEO. On 19 June 2013, Combes announced "The Shift Plan", a three-year plan including refocusing the portfolio on IP networking, ultra-broadband access and cloud; €1 billion in cost savings; selective asset sales intended to generate at least €1 billion over the period of the plan; and the restructuring of the group's debt.

In 2014, a Bell Labs location was opened in Kfar Sava, a suburb of Tel Aviv, Israel. It was expected to research cloud services, complementing another Tel Aviv location set up by Alcatel in 1985 which was the global research center for the Cloudband product.

On 1 October 2014, the company announced that it had closed the sale of its subsidiary Alcatel-Lucent Enterprise (ALE) to China Huaxin Post & Telecommunication Economy Development Center.

In 2014, the Italian labs for the management system for terrestrial networks (1350 OMS) and two families of equipment for fiber optic telecommunications—OMSN (Optical Multi-Service Node) and TSS (Transport Service Switch)—were transferred to a new dedicated company, SM Optics, a subsidiary of the Siae Microelettronica group.

=== Undersea communications and operations ===
Alcatel had a long history of domestic and global work in laying the infrastructure of undersea routes for telecommunications. Purchases by Alcatel in the 1990s included the Enderby's Wharf site on the Thames in London, where cables were made from the 1850s; and Les Câbles de Lyon at Calais, established in 1891.

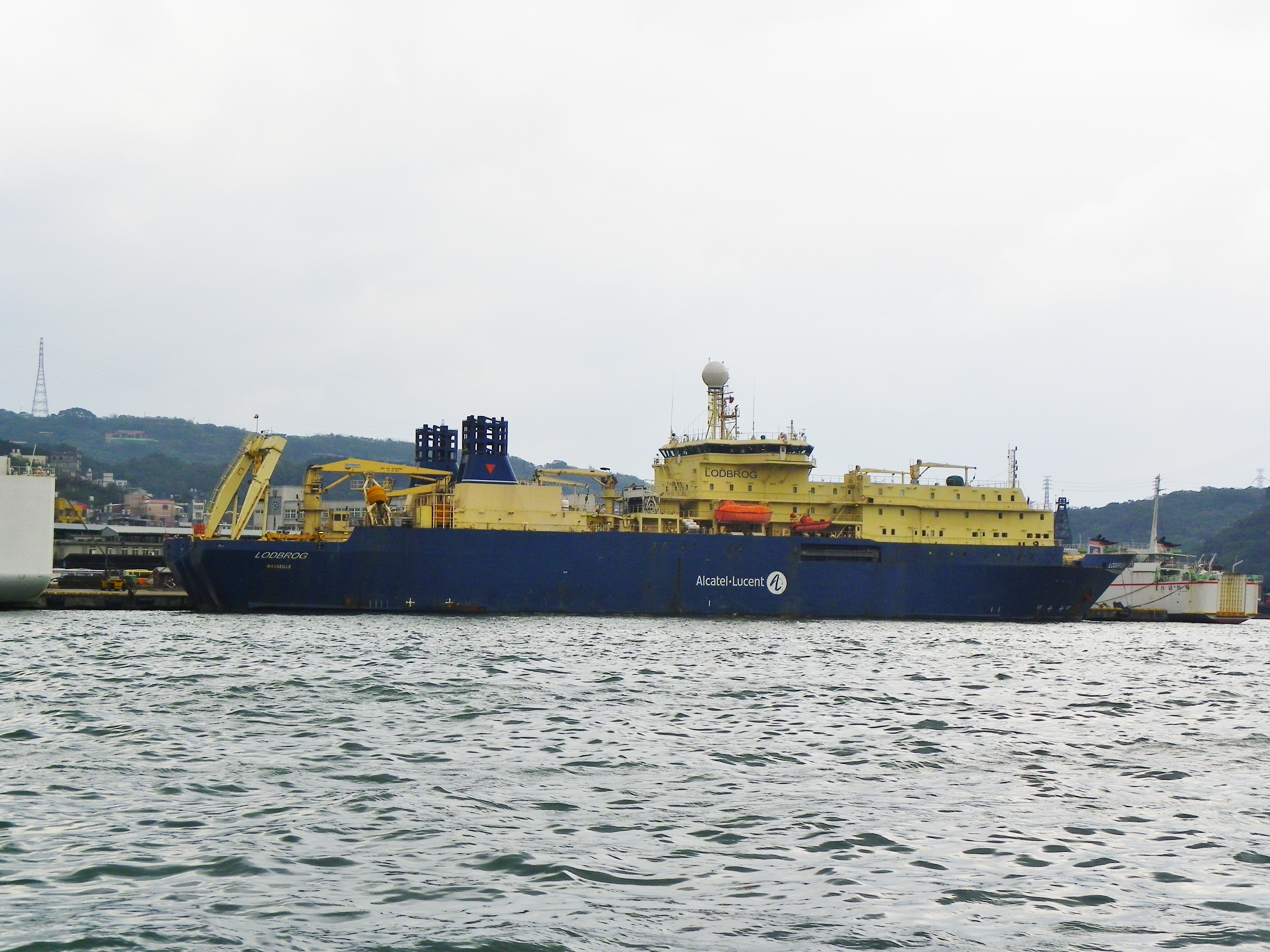
Alcatel-Lucent ship Lodbrog in 2013

By 2004, Alcatel had several cable ships in undersea operations. According to service logs, there were four ships operated by Louis Dreyfus Armatuers: Ile de Batz, Ile de Brehat, Ile de Re, Ile de Sein. At the same time, Alcatel had a subsidiary, Alcatel Submarine Networks Marine A/S, with cable ships, Heimdal and Lodbrog. Another subsidiary, Alcatel Contracting Norway AS, operated CS Stanelco.

Since Alcatel was a manufacturer of telecommunication components for undersea cables, they also used company repeaters in their operations. Repeaters are used for amplification of the copper cable voice transmission over long distance undersea cables. The manufacturing location, operating since 1858, was in Greenwich, UK for the production of amplifiers, repeaters, and other submerged equipment.

Between May 2008 and September 2010, Alcatel-Lucent completed 10,000 kilometers of two-fiber-pair cabling on the EASSy link. Alcatel-Lucent used DWDM technology to transmit SDH frames over nine stations connecting South Africa to Sudan using this undersea fiber cabling type.

In 2011, the Alcatel CS Ile de Sein assisted in recovering the Air France Flight 447 data recorder in the Atlantic. A remotely operated vehicle from Phoenix International Inc. assisted the ship. Alcatel-Lucent purchased a cable ship named CS Gulmar Badaro, in 2011 renaming it CS Ile d'Aix for further expansion of operations. This vessel was built in 1992 and had facilities for cable laying and repair.

A manufacturing location for analogue systems and seismic sensors in Trondheim, Norway, was acquired by Alcatel-Lucent in November 2014.

In 2015, Alcatel-Lucent renewed their partnership with Louis Dreyfus Armateurs (LDA). Alcatel-Lucent took ownership of all seven ships in the fleet, which would be operated by LDA.

In 2016, Bell Labs achieved a 6,600 kilometer single mode transoceanic fiber for Alcatel-Lucent Submarine Networks deployment, after the Nokia and Alcatel-Lucent merger occurred. By this time, 580,000 kilometers of optical submarine cables/systems had been deployed globally by Alcatel-Lucent.

=== Purchase by Nokia ===
On 15 April 2015, Finnish telecommunications firm Nokia announced its intent to purchase Alcatel-Lucent for €15.6 billion in an all-stock deal. The acquisition aimed to create a stronger competitor to the rival firms Ericsson and Huawei, whom Nokia and Alcatel-Lucent had surpassed in terms of total combined revenue in 2014. The acquisition was expected to be completed in early 2016, and was subject to regulatory and shareholder approval. Combes left in September and was replaced by Philippe Camus (who had been chairman of the board since 2008) as interim CEO. Regulatory approval was obtained in October 2015 and shareholder approval was announced on 4 January 2016. The Bell Labs division would be maintained, but the Alcatel-Lucent brand would be replaced by Nokia.

On 14 January 2016, Alcatel-Lucent started operating as part of the Nokia Group. After the sale to Nokia was finalized on 3 November, the Alcatel-Lucent brand was discontinued, and the remaining services were transferred directly into Nokia Networks.

== Organization ==
The company's global headquarters (now a Nokia office) was in Boulogne-Billancourt, France. It had previous head offices in the 7th arrondissement and 8th arrondissement of Paris, France. Its previous head office, in the 8th arrondissement, was built between 1912 and 1929 and was renovated in 1998. During the renovation, the building was decorated with materials on the theme of the cosmos and time.

There were regional groups for the Americas, Asia Pacific & China, and Europe, Middle East & Africa. Middle East and Africa Headquarters were at Smart Village, Giza, Egypt. Alcatel was present in Italy with various research centers: Vimercate (in Lombardy), Rieti, Battipaglia, Trieste, Genova, Bari, Naples, Rome and Sesto Fiorentino; by 2014, their presence was only in Vimercate, Trieste and Rome.

=== Key people ===
- Philippe Camus (Chairman)
- Michel Combes (CEO)
- Stuart Eizenstat
- Jean-Cyril Spinetta

== Operating segments ==
The Core Networking segment included three business divisions: IP Routing, IP Transport and IP Platforms. The Access segment included 4 business divisions: Wireless, Fixed Access, Licensing and Managed Services.

== Research and development ==
Bell Labs was Alcatel-Lucent's research and development (R & D) organization.

In 1876, Alexander Graham Bell was awarded the first patent for the telephone, and subsequently started AT&T. Bell Labs is named in his honor.

In 1937, Clinton Davisson shared the Nobel Prize in Physics for demonstrating the wave nature of matter. His fundamental work is part of the foundation for much of today's solid-state electronics.

In 1947, John Bardeen, Walter Brattain, William Shockley of Bell Labs invented the transistor. In 1956, they received a Nobel Prize for their invention. The transistor led to an electronics revolution during the post-war boom. The transition from vacuum tubes to transistors enabled all technologies to be built on a smaller scale and use less electricity. Items that before required large dedicated spaces, could now fit into a home or even on a kitchen counter.

In 1954, Gerald Pearson, Darryl Chapin and Calvin Fuller invented the solar cell. Telstar, the first active communications satellite also developed by Bell Labs and launched in 1962, used these solar cell batteries as an external renewable source of power once launched. It was the first to carry live television over water, between England and the US.

In the late 1950s, Charles Townes and Arthur Shawlow of Bell Labs invented the laser, which has numerous applications, including measuring/cutting in the manufacturing industry and research/surgery in the medical industry. Bell Labs was awarded the laser patent in 1960.

In 1964, Arno Allan Penzias and Robert Woodrow Wilson discovered the cosmic microwave background radiation. They were awarded the Nobel Prize in Physics in 1978.

In 1969, Dennis Ritchie and a team of Bell Labs employees invented the UNIX operating system and the C programming language.

In 2006, Willard S. Boyle and George E. Smith were awarded the National Academy of Engineering prize, for work on charge-coupled devices which transform patterns of light into useful digital information. In 2009, they received a Nobel Prize for their invention. The device is widely used in digital cameras, video cameras and modern astronomy.

In 2013, there was a Net R&D investment of €2.3 billion (approx. 16% of sales). There are more than 32,000 active patents, more than 3,000 obtained in 2013, and 14,900 pending patent applications.

== Awards and distinctions ==
Alcatel-Lucent was selected by MIT Technology Review in its 2012 TR50 List of the World's Most Innovative Companies. The magazine recognized Alcatel-Lucent lightRadio as a "key innovation". Also in 2012, Alcatel-Lucent won the Mobile World Congress Best Infrastructure Technology Award for the lightRadio Network.

In 2014, the company was named Industry Group Leader in the Technology Hardware & Equipment sector in the Dow Jones Sustainability Indices review, and was listed in the Thomson Reuters Top 100 Global Innovators for the fourth consecutive year.

== Lawsuits ==
=== Violations of the U.S. Foreign Corrupt Practices Act ===
In December 2010, Alcatel-Lucent agreed to pay a total settlement of $137 million for bribing officials in Costa Rica, Honduras, Malaysia and Taiwan in violation of the U.S. Foreign Corrupt Practices Act (FCPA). The U.S. Securities and Exchange Commission (SEC) alleged that Alcatel retained consultants to funnel bribes of over $8 million to government officials in order to obtain and retain lucrative telecommunications contracts. Alcatel admitted that it made profits of approximately $48 million as a result of the bribes and was ordered to pay $45 million to settle charges with the SEC and a further $92 million to settle the criminal charges brought by the U.S. Department of Justice (DOJ).

=== Alcatel-Lucent v. Microsoft ===
Lucent Technologies filed suit against Gateway and Dell, claiming they had violated patents on MP3, MPEG and other technologies developed by Bell Labs, a division of predecessor company American Telephone & Telegraph. Microsoft voluntarily joined the lawsuit in April 2003, and Alcatel was added after it acquired Lucent.

The first part of the case involved two audio coding patents that Alcatel-Lucent claimed were infringed by Microsoft's Windows Media Player application. Alcatel-Lucent won the trial and $1.52 billion in damages, but the judge granted Microsoft's motion for judgment and new trial. Alcatel-Lucent appealed.

In the second part of the case, the judge ruled that Microsoft had not violated Alcatel-Lucent's patents relating to speech recognition and the case was therefore dismissed before going to trial. Alcatel-Lucent intended to appeal.

The third part of the case, involving several user interface-related patents, began on 21 May 2013.

Additional patent infringement cases, some filed by Microsoft and some filed by Alcatel-Lucent, are pending in the United States.

=== Alcatel-Lucent v. Newegg and Overstock ===
In May 2013, Newegg and Overstock won a victory in United States circuit court in which an Alcatel-Lucent shopping cart patent was invalidated.
