= Agere Systems =

American integrated circuit components company

Agere Systems, Inc.
- Industry: Semiconductor-integrated circuits
- Founded: Spun off from Lucent Technologies on June 1, 2002; 23 years ago
- Defunct: April 2, 2007; 19 years ago
- Fate: Merged into LSI Corporation
- Successor: LSI Corporation, Avago Technologies, and Intel Corp
- Headquarters: Allentown, Pennsylvania, U.S.
- Key people: Richard L. Clemmer, President and CEO
- Products: Integrated circuits
- Number of employees: ~17,000
- Website: agere.com at the Wayback Machine (archived 2006-02-09)

Agere Systems, Inc. was an integrated circuit components company based in Allentown, Pennsylvania. Spun out of Lucent Technologies in 2002, Agere was merged into LSI Corporation in 2007. LSI was in turn acquired by Avago Technologies in 2014. In early 2016, Avago acquired the former Broadcom Corporation, and took on the name Broadcom Inc.

== History ==
Agere was incorporated on August 1, 2000, as a subsidiary of Lucent Technologies and then spun off on June 1, 2002. The name Agere was that of a Texas-based electronics company that Lucent had acquired in 2000, although the pronunciations of the company names are different. The Texas company was pronounced with three syllables and a hard "g": /eɪˈɡɪərə/. The company name was pronounced with two syllables and a hard "g": /eɪˈɡɪər/. Agere is a Latin verb meaning "to act", "to do", or "to make".

Apart from the main office in Allentown and elsewhere in Pennsylvania, the company also maintained domestic offices and manufacturing facilities in Florida, Texas, and California. Internationally, Agere had presences in India, Israel, China, the Netherlands, the United Kingdom, and Spain.

=== Microsoft suit ===
In 2007, Agere Systems sued Microsoft for theft of key technology used in Internet telephony.

The allegations concerned meetings between Agere and Microsoft in 2002 and 2003, where the companies discussed selling Agere's stereophonic acoustic echo cancellation technology to Microsoft. Just before the agreement was to be signed, Microsoft ended the discussions saying that it made a significant breakthrough in its own, heretofore undisclosed research program, and no longer needed Agere's technology. The result of the lawsuit is unknown.

=== 2025 security vulnerability ===
In 2025, the Windows Agere Modem Driver (ltmdm64.sys) was the subject of a critical Elevation of Privilege vulnerability CVE-2025-24990, which allowed a low-privileged local user to gain system administrative rights on all affected Windows systems before the driver's removal in the October 2025 cumulative update.
