= Chatham Manufacturing Mill =

Textile mill in North Carolina, US

- Chatham Manufacturing Company-Western Electric Company
- U.S. National Register of Historic Places
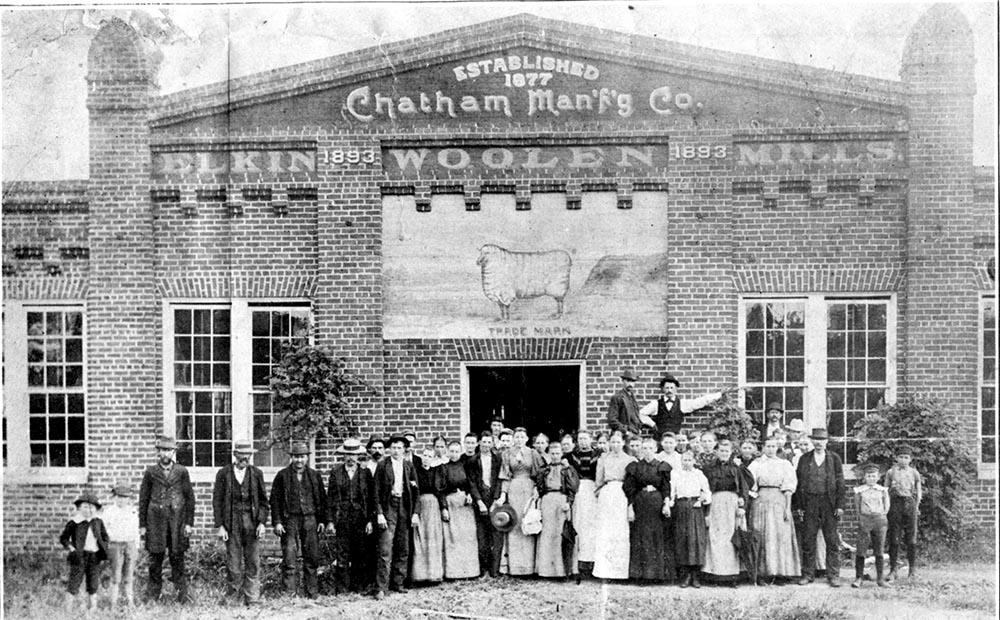
- The second Chatham Mill, built in 1893

- Location within North Carolina Location within the United States
- Location: 750 & 800 Chatham Rd., Winston-Salem, North Carolina
- Coordinates: 36°6′17″N 80°15′18″W
- Area: 6 acres (2.4 ha)
- Built: 1907
- NRHP reference No.: 11000509
- Added to NRHP: August 4, 2011

Chatham Manufacturing Mill was built by the Chatham Manufacturing Company. The former textile mill is located in Winston-Salem in North Carolina.

== History ==
The Chatham Manufacturing Company was founded in 1877 in Elkin North Carolina. The original Mill was on Elkin Creek, but moved alongside the Yadkin River to take advantage of the railroad.

== Growth ==
A second factory would be built in Winston-Salem, North Carolina in 1907 and expanded through 1951. The factory complex consists of a series of interconnected one to five-story heavy timber frame, brick, steel, and concrete industrial buildings. The complex also includes a coal trestle (1907); two small buildings erected in the 1940s (a brick fire pump house and a concrete block workshop); an electrical substation (1948-1954); and a one-story brick office building (1937). The Chatham Manufacturing Company consolidated its operations at Elkin in 1940, and the Winston-Salem plant was subsequently purchased by the United States Government. It was occupied by National Carbon Company (1943-1945) and Western Electric (1946-1966), who manufactured equipment for the United States military.

The Winston-Salem complex was listed on the National Register of Historic Places in 2011.

During the first part of the century the primary focus of company sales were blankets but by the 1930s the company started producing automotive upholstery. By the 1980s the company had plants located in Eden, North Carolina and Charlotte, North Carolina along with the Elkin plant.

== Current use ==
The mill complex has been redeveloped into luxury apartments.
