= Philippe Camus (businessman) =

French businessman (born 1948)

- Born: 28 June 1948 (age 77); Paris, France
- Education: École normale supérieure
- Occupation: Business executive

Philippe Camus (born 28 June 1948) is a French businessman whose executive positions include CEO at transnational aerospace company EADS (2000 to 2005) and chairman and interim CEO at French/American telecommunications supplier Alcatel-Lucent (2008 to 2016).

== Biography ==
Camus was born on 28 June 1948. He is a graduate of the École normale supérieure, Paris.

He was decorated the Cross of the German Merit Order in 2004 and the Officer of the French Legion of Honour in 2005.

== Career ==
In 1972, he began working for Caisse des dépôts et consignations, where he improved the operation of the French bond market. In 1992, he joined the Lagardère Group media company. In 1993, he was appointed as managing director of Lagardère where he helped to restructure its Matra aerospace and transportation subsidiary, overseeing several acquisitions, mergers and divestitures. After the mergers of aerospace companies in France, Germany and Spain which formed EADS (now Airbus), Camus was CEO of EADS from 2000 to 2005.

In 2008, he was appointed as chairman of the board of Alcatel-Lucent, a French/American maker of telecommunications equipment. He was then interim CEO from 1 September 2015 to 21 June 2016, following the company's agreement to merge with Nokia.

=== Other appointments ===
From 1996 to 2001, he served on the French supervisory authority for the financial markets. From 2001 to 2005, he was the President of GIFAS, the French aerospace industries association. He served on the boards of directors of Crédit Agricole (2005 to 2009), Accor (2006 to 2008), and Schlumberger (2007 to 2012). He is a senior advisor at investment bank Evercore Partners.
