= Serge Tchuruk =

French businessman

- Born: 13 November 1937 (age 88); Marseille, France
- Education: École Polytechnique
- Occupation: Businessman

Serge Tchurukdichian (born 13 November 1937), known as Serge Tchuruk, is a French businessman of Armenian descent. He was the chief executive officer and chairman of Alcatel (a global telecommunications company) until the end of November 2006 and was the chairman of Alcatel-Lucent until his resignation in October 2008.

Serge Tchuruk was graduate of the École Polytechnique in 1962 and was a member of the Corps de l'armement.

Business positions
Preceded by François-Xavier Ortoli	CEO of Total S.A. 1990–1995	Succeeded by Thierry Desmarest
