= Richard McGinn =

American businessman

Richard A. McGinn is an American businessman who was the chief executive officer of Lucent Technologies.
