= Lucent Technologies =

American telecommunications company (1996-2006)

Lucent Technologies, Inc.
- Type: Public
- Traded as: NYSE: LU
- Industry: Telecommunications equipment
- Predecessor: AT&T Technologies (holding company of Western Electric and Bell Labs)
- Founded: September 30, 1996; 30 years ago
- Defunct: December 1, 2006; 19 years ago
- Fate: Acquired by and merged with Alcatel SA to form Alcatel-Lucent
- Successor: Alcatel-Lucent
- Headquarters: Murray Hill, New Jersey, United States
- Key people: Henry Schacht (CEO); Richard McGinn (CEO)
- Revenue: ▲US$9.44 billion (2005)
- Number of employees: 30,500 (2006)
- Website: lucent.com at the Wayback Machine (archived 2005-02-16)

Lucent Technologies, Inc. was an American multinational telecommunications equipment company headquartered in Murray Hill, New Jersey. It was established on September 30, 1996, through the divestiture of the former AT&T Technologies business unit of AT&T Corporation, which included Western Electric and Bell Labs.

Lucent was acquired by the French technology company Alcatel on December 1, 2006, forming Alcatel-Lucent.

== Name and logo ==
Lucent means "light-bearing" in Latin. The name was applied for in 1996 at the time of the split from AT&T. Corporate communications and business cards included the strapline 'Bell Labs Innovations' in a bid to retain the prestige of the internationally famous research lab, within a new business under an as-yet unknown name.

This same linguistic root also gives Lucifer, "the light bearer" (from lux, 'light', and ferre, 'to bear'), who is also a character in Dante's epic poem Inferno. Shortly after the Lucent renaming in 1996, Lucent's Plan 9 project released a development of their work as the Inferno OS in 1997. This extended the 'Lucifer' and Dante references as a series of punning names for the components of Inferno – Dis, Limbo, Charon and Styx (9P Protocol). When the rights to Inferno were sold in 2000, the company Vita Nuova Holdings was formed to represent them. This continued the Dante theme, although moving away from his Divine Comedy to the poem La Vita Nuova.

The Lucent logo, the Innovation Ring, was designed by Landor Associates, a prominent San Francisco-based branding consultancy. One source inside Lucent says that the logo is a Zen Buddhist symbol for "eternal truth", the Ensō, turned 90 degrees and modified. Another source says it represents the mythic ouroboros, a snake holding its tail in its mouth. Lucent's logo also has been said to represent constant re-creating and re-thinking. Carly Fiorina picked the logo because her mother was a painter and she rejected the sterile geometric logos of most high tech companies.

After the logo was compared in the media to the ring a coffee mug leaves on paper, a Dilbert comic strip showed Dogbert as an overpaid consultant designing a new company logo; he takes a piece of paper that his coffee cup was sitting on and calls it the "Brown Ring of Quality". A telecommunication commentator referred to the logo as "a big red zero" and predicted financial losses.

== History ==
One of the primary reasons AT&T Corporation chose to spin off its equipment manufacturing business was to permit it to profit from sales to competing telecommunications providers; these customers had previously shown reluctance to purchase from a direct competitor. Bell Labs brought prestige to the new company, as well as the revenue from thousands of patents.

At the time of its spinoff, Lucent was placed under the leadership of Henry Schacht, who was brought in to oversee its transition from an arm of AT&T into an independent corporation. Richard McGinn, who was president and COO, succeeded Schacht as CEO in 1997 while Schacht remained chairman of the board. Lucent became a "darling" stock of the investment community in the late 1990s, and its split-adjusted spinoff price of $7.56/share rose to a high of $84. Its market capitalization reached a high of $258 billion, and it was at the time the most widely held company with 5.3 million shareholders.

In 1995, Carly Fiorina led corporate operations. In that capacity, she reported to Lucent chief executive Henry B. Schacht. She played a key role in planning and implementing the 1996 initial public offering of a successful stock and company launch strategy. Under her guidance, the spin-off raised US$3 billion.

Later in 1996, Fiorina was appointed president of Lucent's consumer products sector, reporting to president and chief operating officer Rich McGinn. In 1997, she was named group president for Lucent's US$19 billion global service-provider business, overseeing marketing and sales for the company's largest customer segment. That year, Fiorina chaired a US$2.5 billion joint venture between Lucent's consumer communications and Royal Philips Electronics, under the name Philips Consumer Communications (PCC). The focus of the venture was to bring both companies to the top three in technology, distribution, and brand recognition.

Ultimately, the project struggled, and dissolved a year later after it garnered only 2% market share in mobile phones. Losses were at $500 million on sales of $2.5 billion. As a result of the failed joint venture, Philips announced the closure of one-quarter of the company's 230 factories worldwide, and Lucent closed down its wireless handset portion of the venture. Analysts suggested that the joint venture's failure was due to a combination of technology and management problems. Upon the end of the joint venture, PCC sent 5,000 employees back to Philips, many of which were laid off, and 8,400 employees back to Lucent.

Under Fiorina, the company added 22,000 jobs and revenues seemed to grow from US$19 billion to US$38 billion. However, the real cause of Lucent spurring sales under Fiorina was by lending money to their own customers. According to Fortune magazine, "In a neat bit of accounting magic, money from the loans began to appear on Lucent's income statement as new revenue while the dicey debt got stashed on its balance sheet as an allegedly solid asset". Lucent's stock price grew 10-fold.

In 1997, Lucent acquired Milpitas-based voicemail market leader Octel Communications Corporation for $1.8 billion, a move which immediately rendered the Business Systems Group profitable. The same year, Lucent acquired Livingston Enterprises Inc. for $650 million in stock. Livingston was known most for the creation of the RADIUS protocol and its PortMaster product that was used widely by dial-up internet service providers. In 1999, Lucent acquired Ascend Communications, an Alameda, California–based manufacturer of communications equipment for US$20 billion. Lucent held discussions to acquire Juniper Networks but decided instead to buy Nexabit Networks.

At the start of 2000, Lucent's "private bubble" burst, while competitors like Nortel Networks and Alcatel were still going strong; it would be many months before the rest of the telecom industry bubble collapsed. Previously Lucent had 14 straight quarters where it exceeded analysts' expectations, leading to high expectations for the 15th quarter, ending Dec. 31, 1999. On January 6, 2000, Lucent made the first of a string of announcements that it had missed its quarterly estimates, as CEO Rich McGinn grimly announced that Lucent had run into special problems during that quarter—including disruptions in its optical networking business—and reported flat revenues and a big drop in profits. That caused the stock to plunge by 28%, shaving $64 billion off of the company's market capitalization. When it was later revealed that it had used dubious accounting and sales practices to generate some of its earlier quarterly numbers, Lucent fell from grace. It was said that "Rich McGinn couldn't accept Lucent's fall from its early triumphs." He described himself once as imposing "audacious" goals on his managers, believing the stretch for performance would produce dream results. Henry Schacht defended the corporate culture that McGinn created and noted that McGinn did not sell any Lucent shares while CEO. In June 2000, Lucent announced it would acquire Chromartis, an Israeli maker of optical network equipment, for $4.5 billion In November 2000, the company disclosed to the Securities and Exchange Commission that it had a $125 million accounting error for the third quarter of 2000, and by December 2000 it reported it had overstated its revenues for its latest quarter by nearly $700 million. Although no wrongdoing was found on his part, McGinn was forced to resign as CEO and he was replaced by Schacht on an interim basis. Subsequently, its CFO, Deborah Hopkins, left the company in May 2001 with Lucent's stock at $9.06 whereas at the time she was hired it was at $46.82. In August 2001, Lucent shut down Chromartis.

In April 2000, Lucent sold its Consumer Products unit to VTech. In October 2000, Lucent spun off its Business Systems arm into Avaya, Inc., and in June 2002, it spun off its microelectronics division into Agere Systems. The spinoffs of enterprise networking and wireless, the industry's key growth businesses from 2003 onward, meant that Lucent no longer had the capacity to serve this market.

In May 2000, Lucent received the Shingo Prize for Excellence in Manufacturing at the Mount Olive, New Jersey Product Realization Center.

In May and December 2001 there were merger discussions between Lucent and Alcatel, which would have seen Lucent acquired at its current market price without a premium; the newly combined entity would have been headquartered in Murray Hill. However, these negotiations collapsed when Schacht insisted on an equal 7–7 split of the merged company's board of directors, while Alcatel chief executive officer Serge Tchuruk wanted 8 of the 14 board seats for Alcatel due to it being in a stronger position. The failure of the merger talks caused Lucent's share price to collapse, and by October 2002 the stock price had bottomed at 55 cents per share.

In August 2001, certain Lucent Technologies manufacturing assets in Oklahoma City, Oklahoma and Columbus, Ohio were signed into a five-year supply agreement by Celestica and positioned it as a lead electronics manufacturing services provider for Lucent’s North American wireless networking systems, access, and switching products. With this supply agreement, Lucent became one of the top three customers with over 10% of the revenue for Celestica in 2001, IBM and Sun Microsystems were the other customers in this Celestica revenue segment. The Lucent deal earned $570 million in cash from Celestica and possible value of up to $10 billion for the electronics manufacturing service contractor. Lucent's operational strategy was to continue developing networking systems, instead of manufacturing with this partnership with Celestica.

On January 7, 2002, Patricia Russo, formerly Lucent's EVP of the Corporate Office who then left for Eastman Kodak as COO, was named permanent chairman and CEO of Lucent, succeeding Schacht who remained on the board of directors.

Lucent was reduced to 30,500 employees, down from about 165,000 employees at its zenith. The layoffs of so many experienced employees meant that the company was in a weakened position and unable to re-establish itself when the market recovered in 2003. By early 2003, Lucent's market value was $15.6 billion (which includes $6.8 billion of current value for two companies that Lucent had recently spun off, Avaya and Agere Systems), making the shares worth around $2.13, a far cry from its dotcom bubble peak of around $84, when Lucent was worth $258 billion.

Lucent continued to be active in the areas of telephone switching, optical, data and wireless networking.

In 2004, the SEC charged Lucent with a $25 million fine for the company's lack of cooperation in their fraud case.

On April 2, 2006, Lucent announced a merger agreement with Alcatel, which was 1.5 times the size of Lucent. Serge Tchuruk became non-executive chairman, and Russo was CEO of the newly merged company, Alcatel-Lucent, until they were both forced to resign at the end of 2008. The merger failed to produce the expected synergies, and there were significant write-downs of Lucent's assets that Alcatel purchased.

== Operations ==
=== Divisions ===
Lucent was divided into several core groups:

- Network Solutions Group served landline/cellular telephone service providers by providing equipment and other solutions necessary to provide telephone service, including networking equipment.
- Lucent Worldwide Services (LWS) provided network services to telecom companies and business; clients included AT&T Corporation and Verizon. Divisions of LWS included the AT&T Customer Business Unit, known as ACBU; and another group for Southwestern Bell and other Bell companies. Both divisions were responsible for the installation of telecom equipment ranging from 2-pair copper to multi-wire fiber optics. Each group also installed the first true national cellular service with LTE speeds in the 1990s.
- Bell Labs was created in 1925 as the R&D firm of the Bell System. It was an AT&T subsidiary set up as dual ownership by AT&T and Western Electric, the manufacturing arm of AT&T.

=== Murray Hill facility ===
The Murray Hill facility in New Providence, New Jersey was the global headquarters for Lucent Technologies. There was a cricket field in the grounds.

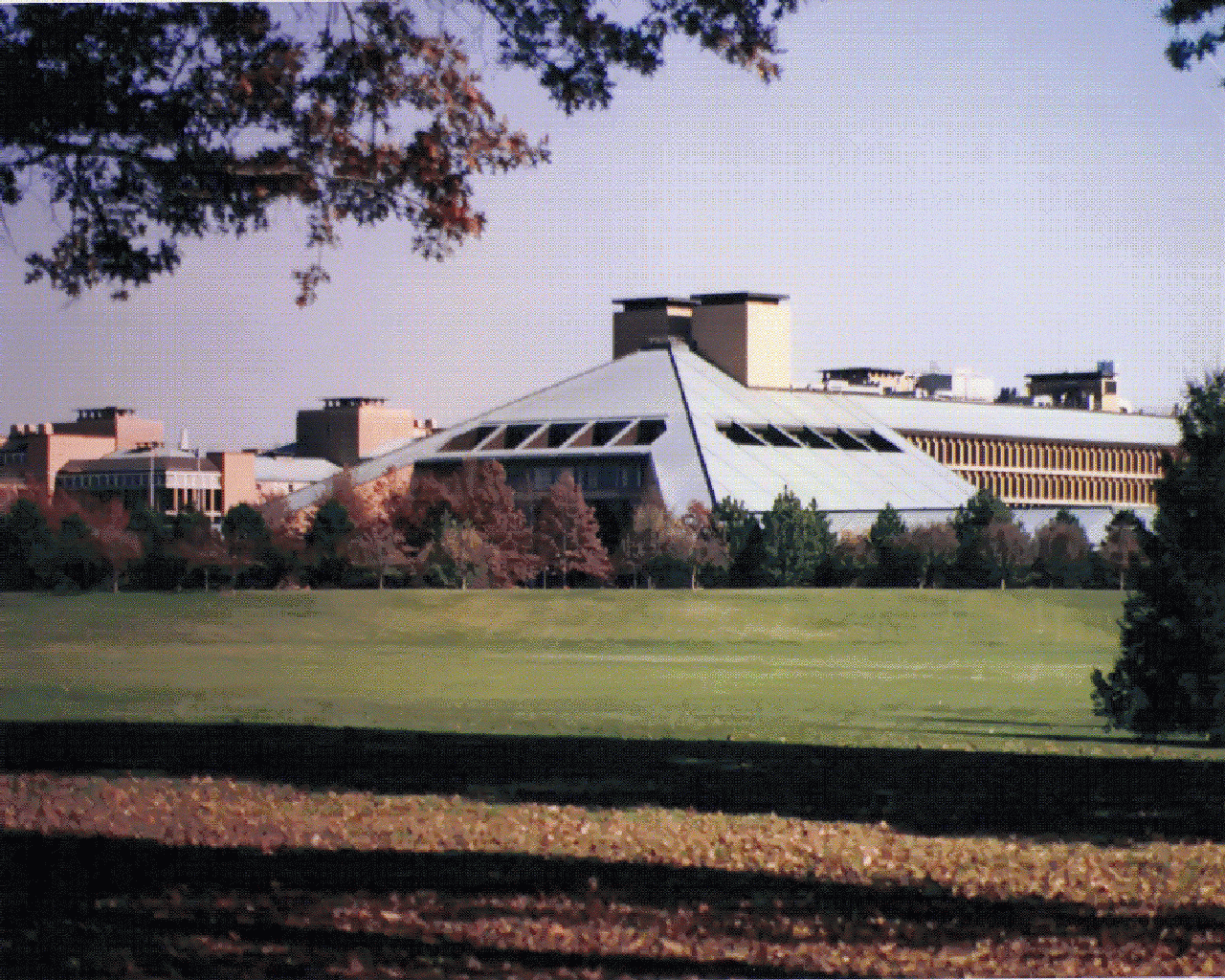
Lucent headquarters, Murray Hill, New Jersey, 2007

The Murray Hill anechoic chamber, built in 1940, is the world's oldest wedge-based anechoic chamber. The interior room measures approximately 30 feet (9.1 m) high by 28 feet (8.5 m) wide by 32 feet (9.8 m) deep. The exterior concrete and brick walls are about 3 feet (0.91 m) thick to keep outside noise from entering the chamber. The chamber absorbs over 99.995% of the incident acoustic energy above 200 Hz. At one time the Murray Hill chamber was cited in the Guinness Book of World Records as the world's quietest room.

=== Mount Olive facility ===
The Mount Olive Product Realization Center (MTO-PRC) facility in Mount Olive, New Jersey was part of the Wireless Networks Group business unit. The 252,000 square-feet building was constructed for AT&T Corp. in 1994. The two leased buildings were located at the International Trade Center (New Jersey) and one building was used for warehousing and the other used for wireless products manufacturing since 1995. An additionally built wireless products manufacturing, PRC, was located in Piscataway, New Jersey also independently of AT&T creation.

This system integration plant was a manufacturing location with the business unit under one roof. This allowed, the development, design, business functions for manufacturing cellular phone parts and between 1996 and 1999, the production of first generation CDMA (Code-division multiple access) minicells needed for cellular phone carriers. A 1,015-lb second generation Flexent Modcell cabinet was introduced in October 1999 for production as PCS (1.9 gigahertz) and TDMA (time-division multiple access) cellular (850 MHz) versions.

From 1996 to 1999, PRC achieved and reduced with this new facility the following production metrics and lean manufacturing statistics: product-development cycle time reduced over 50%, material cost reduced 43%, cost of goods by 68%, assembly productivity increased close to 150%, assembly defects reduced by 80%, manufacturing inventory reduced 70%, and 100% on-time delivery. The facility introduced several self-managed work teams called PODs (Production On Demand) to assemble and test 50 Flexent Modcells daily.

The location was also active in research and development of CDMA minicells for future global market growth and third generation W-CDMA (Wideband Code-Division Multiple Access) innovation. Expansion was evident with minicell lines for the South America market with cross-training technicians from Brazil on the product and the W-CDMA product for Japan's cellular carrier, NTT DoCoMo.

The facility was awarded various awards and prizes for the lean manufacturing of products and excellence in work methods.

In June 2002, Lucent announced closure of the manufacturing building by the end of the year, due to the telecommunication losses in operations. Of the remaining 530 employees at the facility. 170 were employee layoffs and the other 360 employees would mostly transfer to Lucent's Whippany, New Jersey location. The manufacturing of cell based systems would transfer to the Columbus, Ohio facility without employees. In the prior year. the warehouse building had closed for consolidation of facilities and cost reduction.

=== Notable buildings ===
During its expansion in the late 1990s, Lucent commissioned several large office buildings. The architectural firm, Kevin Roche, John Dinkeloo, and Associates (KRJDA) designed five structures clad in energy-efficient, tinted, low-E glass.

- Westminster – built between 1997 and 2001, the Westminster, Colorado building was a 480,000 ft² research and development facility for 1,350 employees. Its design is similar to the Lisle, Illinois building, with two four-story wings arranged with an entrance resembling a glass satellite dish. The building was an expansion to the existing Westminster building via pedestrian bridge.
- Naperville – in 2000, the 600,000 ft² Naperville, Illinois five-story structure was completed for 2000 employees. It had a pedestrian bridge to the existing Indian Hill research and development building. In April 2023, the building was sold for $4.8 million by Nokia to a developer and the new ownership began demolition in August 2023 of those structures formerly called 'Indian Hill New' by Lucent and Alcatel-Lucent.
- Lisle – in 2001, the Network Software Center in Lisle, Illinois was also completed in a similar design of a five-story three building with wings and two parking garages. This research and development building was a 600,000 ft² glass building for 2,000 employees. A pedestrian bridge over an existing lake linked it to the Network Software Center, built in the 1970s.

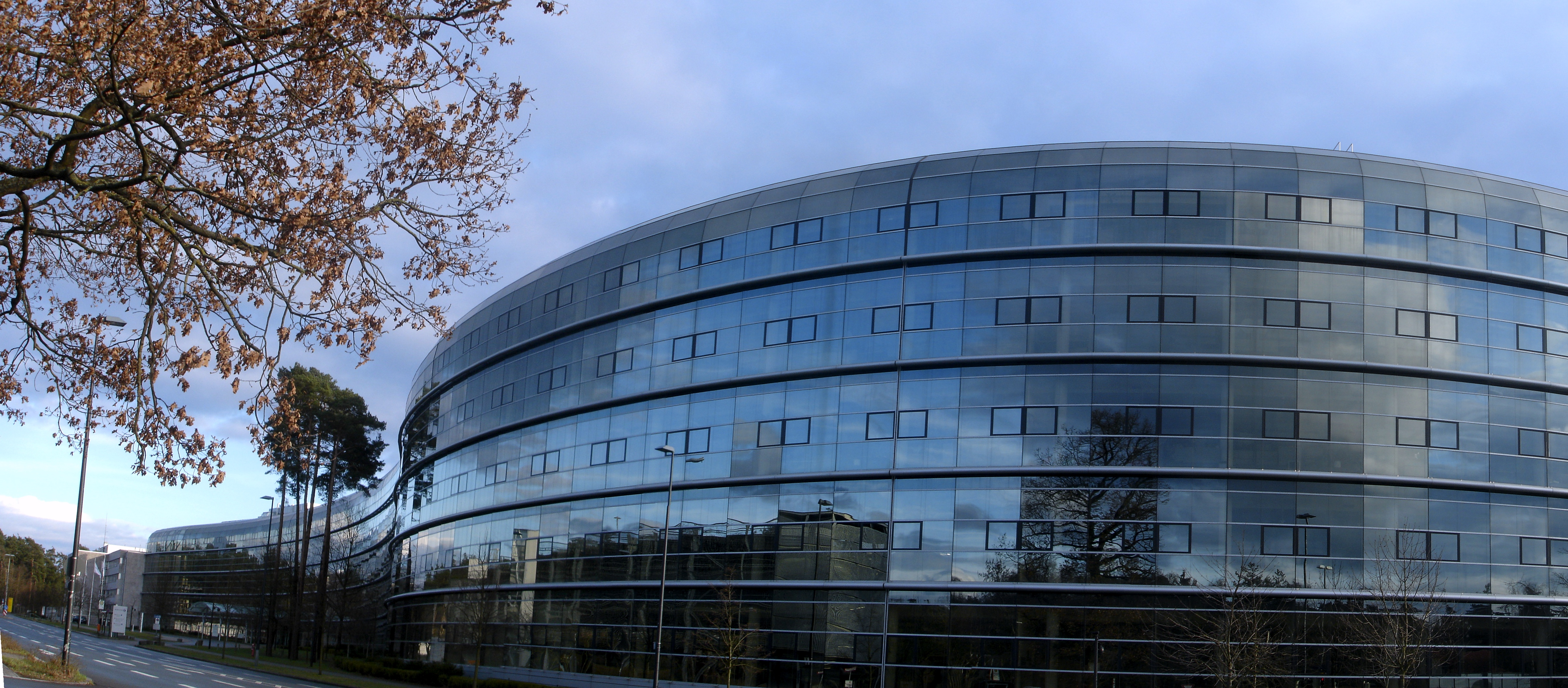
Lucent Technologies Nuremberg building was an expansion to two existing buildings in Germany previously owned by Philips Kommunikations Industrie and acquired by AT&T Network Systems.

- Nuremberg – completed in 2002, the Nuremberg, Germany "serpentine" five-story building was a 215,000 ft² expansion for two existing buildings, with the same aesthetic design as the United States projects. It included a customer center and training area.
- Agere Hanover – the last project was completed in 2002 in Hanover Township, Allentown, Pennsylvania. The project was called the Agere Systems Expansion, which was a three-story administration, research and development building for 2,000 employees with 560,000 ft² of space. These buildings also included parking garages with about 2,000 parking spaces. The new structures were planned in 1998 by Lucent Technologies, before Agere was incorporated on August 1, 2000, and Agere was spun off by Lucent Technologies on June 1, 2002. Built at a cost of $165 million, it became the Agere world headquarters in 2003 with consolidation of offices, research and development operations from former AT&T/Lucent Technologies locations at Allentown, Breinigsville, and Muhlenberg.

=== Leased locations ===
To meet customer and business needs, further locations were built and leased for Lucent, rather than built as corporate assets. At September, 1997 Lucent reported that future non-cancelable lease payments totaled $1,037 million.

- Oklahoma City – in 1997, Adevco Corp. of Norcross, Ga., built the $8 million building for a Lucent customer center to employ 400 people in Oklahoma City, Oklahoma. Additionally, $4 million was added to the cost for components, communications systems, and technology of the 10 year contracted lease. The location was to provide support in orders, billing, and scheduled service for over 1.5 million customers. The 57,000-square-foot building was at 14400 Hertz Quail Springs Parkway and was the largest of four customer care locations. The other three centers being opened were in Tucson, Arizona; Atlanta, Georgia; and Parsippany, New Jersey.
- Altamonte Springs – in 1997, an international telecommunications training center was being constructed for potentially 20,000 yearly students learning the network and computerized phone switches. The Altamonte Springs, Florida 100,000-square-foot center would have approximately 100 employees and consolidate the Northlake Boulevard Altamonte Springs training center with 20 employees. The building was located near Interstate 4 and Central Parkway, and leased from Emerson International. State and city officials gave Lucent a $348,600 four-year incentive packages to build the center at that city. The address was 240 East Central Parkway and considered as Centerpointe building. The training courses were hands-on, lab-based training of company products in data-networking, network-management, optical-networking, wireless, and wireline technologies in either international or domestic markets. The location also provided Navis Optical EMS (Element Management System) System User and Administration Training Using the GUI optical courses. The Customer Training and Information Products at Lucent Technologies facility continued to be known later as Alcatel-Lucent University upon the merger.
- Coppell – in 1998, consolidation of six office buildings, with seven business units, were planned for a new building in Coppell, Texas. A business communications systems division and various local area administration, service, and sales employees were moved to the building. The 100,000-square-foot constructed building was a two-story office building at address, 1111 Freeport Parkway. Catellus Management Corporation was the developer on the project and Compass Management & Leasing was the lessor for Lucent. Lucent's real estate costs for Carrollton and Las Colinas buildings were eliminated with this new building constructed. Also, additional buildings at the following locations were moved as planned: 1841 Hutton in Valwood, 4006 Belt Line Road, 4100 Bryan, 5429 LBJ Freeway, 5501 LBJ Freeway, and 17950 Preston Road. In 1999, Townsend Capital purchased the building and Lucent was subletting the building to Avaya.

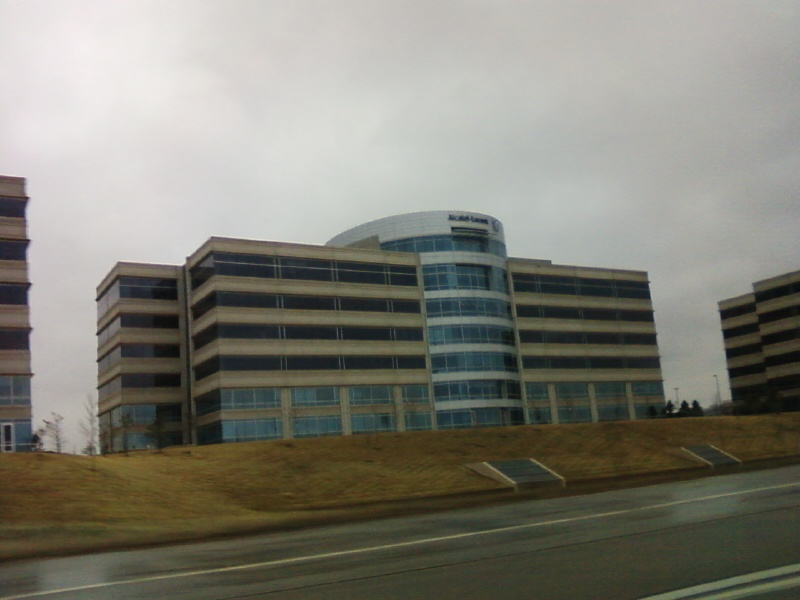
Lucent Technologies building at Highlands Ranch, Colorado. This center building is address 8742 Lucent Blvd and later became Alcatel-Lucent. The other two buildings on the left and right were also built for Lucent until one was later used by Avaya.

- Highlands Ranch – in 1999, Lucent moved its regional headquarters into the recently built Highlands Ranch Business Park at Highlands Ranch, Colorado. Shea Properties constructed the center and anticipated Lucents' decision by changing the name of Highlands Ranch Boulevard to Lucent Boulevard in 1997. The address was 8740-8744 Lucent Blvd and there was 600,000 square feet of office space to consolidate 3,200 employees from 13 sites near Denver. The 37-acre campus of three white precast buildings was built by Citadel National Construction Group in 21 months and Townsend Capital, LLC was the lessor for Lucent's project. The 8744 Lucent Blvd building was later used by Avaya.
- Miramar – in 2000, Lucent announced the Miramar, Florida, 240,000 square foot Caribbean & Latin American division (CALA) regional headquarters, to be built at a cost of $40 million. Opening was expected in summer 2001 at 2400 SW 145th Avenue, to consolidate 1,200 employees from 13 South Florida locations. Clayco built and developed the four-story, V-shaped building, including two wings for Rockefeller Group Development Corporation, the lessor of the building for Lucent's 15-year contract. About 2,500 square feet of lab space was planned for product development as part of this project. In 2002, Lucent's technology bubble burst and it relinquished 150,000 square feet of unused space. Within 24 months, the company recovered $20 million or more from subleasing the former space to new tenants. Alcatel-Lucent continued to use the building for CALA operations after the Lucent merger.

=== International locations ===
- Bangalore - in 1997, Bell Labs R&D was opened in Bangalore, India and after four years of operation, Lucent announced the closure of Bell Labs in India. In August 2001, during the announcement, up to 500 employees were at Bangalore and Hyderabad locations. Lucent planned a $2 billion improvement in capital with restructuring on a global plan. On July 9, 2000, a year earlier, Lucent had hired five Indian teenagers Bangalore jobs as they were considered, the “best and brightest minds” of Chennai and Bangalore.
- Singapore – in 1998, an $8 million education and training center was planned for the Asia Pacific region. The Singapore location would have 20,000 square feet of space with allocation of about 5,000 square feet of lab and equipment areas. The ten classrooms were for training customers on telecommunications services and products.
- Madrid – in 2000, the microelectronics unit of Lucent Technologies located at Tres Cantos, Madrid, Spain was ending production of integrated circuits under Agere. The facility was installed by AT&T in 1987 and became Lucent in 1996. During Lucent's creation of Agere as a subsidiary, the facility became Agere and was later acquired by BP Solar to manufacture photovoltaic panels. Lucent sold the facility in restructuring efforts to reduce staff and reduce the value of manufacturing assets. The location was called Lucent Technologies Madrid or Tres Cantos. Although the facility had a record of turnover production in November 2000 of 180 million euros and 18 million euros in income, it sold after June 2001 to BP due to not exceeding 25% production demand.

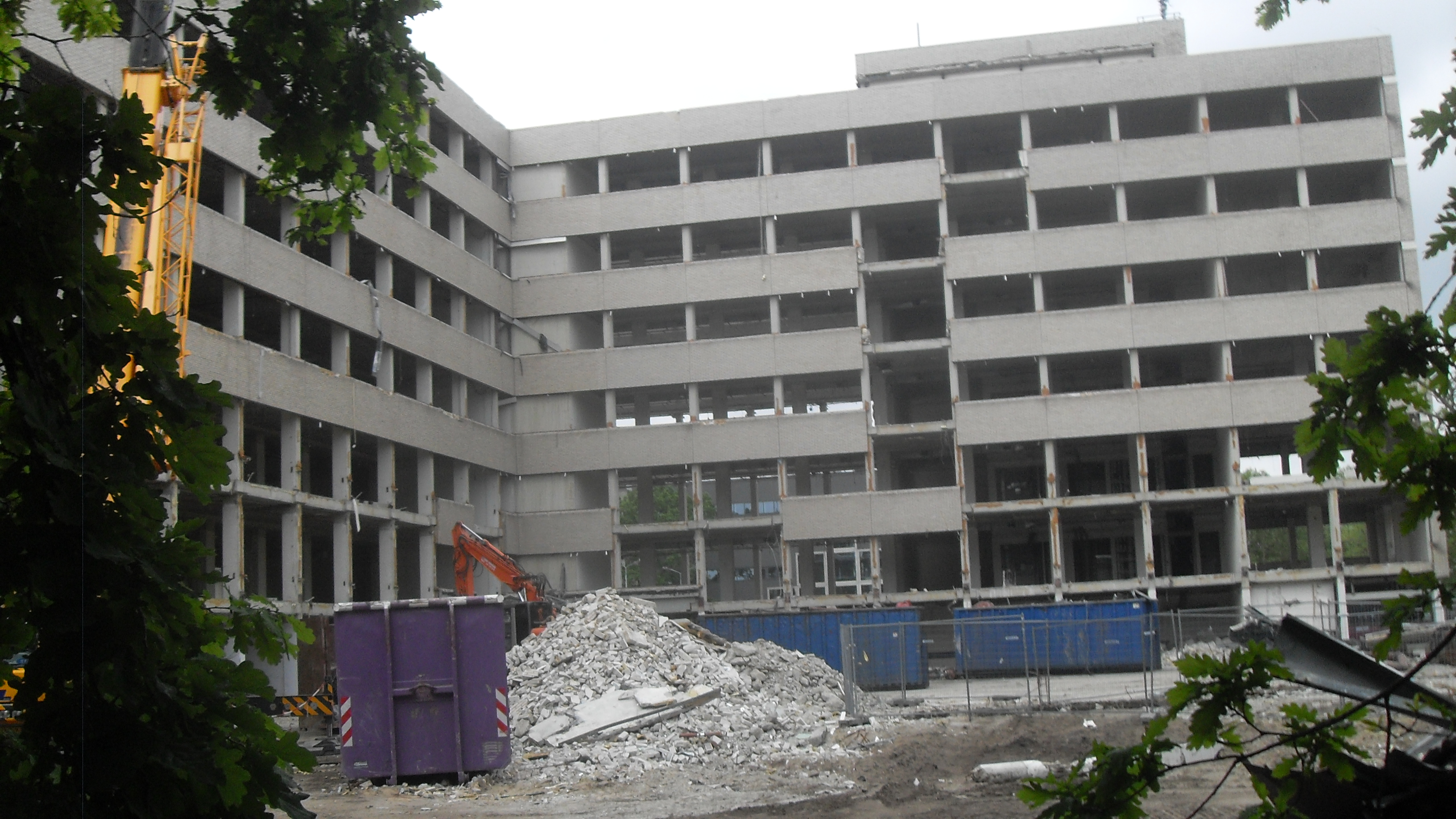
Lucent Technologies buildings were former Philips Telecommunications buildings in Larenseweg, Hilversum, Netherlands. Two out of the four office buildings were demolished in 2015. The former office parking lot became a school building named Lucent College.

- Hyderabad - in 2001, Lucent announced the closure of Bell Labs in India at the Bangalore and Hyderabad, India R&D locations.
- Gurgaon - in 2001, Lucent announced the Bangalore and Hyderabad Bell Labs locations of India to close. The Gurgaon, India location was not in the August 2001 announcement and stated there were about 500 employees at the location supporting networking, marketing, and sales and not associated with the Bell Labs or R&D aspects.
- Hilversum - in 2002, the Hilversum, Netherlands announced a closure of the facility. The closure would result in 300 employees in the Research and Development manufacturing sector. The Hilversum telecommunications operations were originally sold to AT&T from Philips in 1989.
- Bangalore - in 2004, Lucent announced a Bell Research Center in Bangalore, India with development on data and networking management software. The scientists at Bell Labs Research would work on computer algorithms and switch architectures for wireless, optical, or data networking.

=== Domestic manufacturing locations ===
Many of the following manufacturing locations were transferred to other subsidiaries during Lucent's existence, closed, or sold years later. These facilities were established by Western Electric before the 1983 Bell System break-up. AT&T operated and managed these locations from 1984 until 1996. After the AT&T spin-off of Lucent, the telecommunications equipment being manufactured at these locations became products of Lucent Technologies.

Name	Location	Address	Established	Products	Notes
Allentown Works	Allentown, Pennsylvania	555 Union Blvd.	1948	microelectronics	1,036,000 sq. ft. /later Agere Systems. Agere Systems, Inc. and LSI Logic Corporation merged and operated under a new name LSI Corporation effective April 2, 2007. Closed, several buildings demolished of manufacturing, and sold historical building for charter school.
Atlanta Works	Norcross, Georgia	2000 Northeast Expressway	1969	undersea cables, later fiber-optic cables	Lucent closed in 2001 the Optical Fiber Solutions (OFS) business and sold it to Furukawa Electric Co., Ltd. at $2.525 billion. Additionally, Corning Incorporated paid Lucent $225 million for Lucent Technologies Beijing Fiber Optic Cable Co., Ltd. and Lucent Technologies Shanghai Fiber Optic Co. Ltd. of China in this deal.
Columbus Works	Columbus, Ohio	6200 E. Broad St.	1959	switching equipment	1,661,000 sq. ft./ Closed in 2010/2011 under Alcatel-Lucent, sold, and demolished by new owners. From 1957 Western Electric move-in until Bell Labs 1959 move-in, plant reached 3,100 employees. During Western Electric mid 1970s, plant reached 12,000 employees. Between 1984 and 1996, AT&T owned and managed the facility products. From 1996 until 2000, Lucent Technologies changed production with employees concerned of plant operations. About 5,500 employees were in 2000, then Lucent decided to sell in 2001 to Celestica the plant and employees, who did not take severance packages. In 2002 Lucent re-purchased the plant from Celestica. Shortly in 2003, with 1,470 employees in R&D mostly left, Lucent decided to sell the plant. Merger in 2006 with Alcatel-Lucent. In October 2007, Alcatel-Lucent to cease productions and release 230 positions. Alcatel-Lucent in 2009, had 700 employees in non-manufacturing activities. On October 17, 2012, new owners purchased the 84-acre property for $2.3 million and decided to demolish 943,000 square feet of manufacturing space. The historical administration office building later was used as offices.
Dallas Works	Mesquite, Texas	3000 Skyline Drive	1970	electronic switches and power equipment/supplies	Closed and sold.
Denver Works	Westminster, Colorado	12110 Pecos St.	1972	Dimension and Horizon business PBX systems	Closed and sold.
Greensboro Shops	Greensboro, North Carolina	801 Merritt Dr.	1950	military equipment	336,000 sq. ft./ Closed and sold.
Indianapolis Works	Indianapolis, Indiana	2525 Shadeland Ave.	1950	consumer telephone sets	1,824,000 sq. ft. / Closed and sold.
Kansas City Works	Lee's Summit, Missouri	777 N. Blue Pkwy	1961	electronics, switching equipment	1,517,000 sq. ft./ Closed and sold.
Merrimack Valley Works	North Andover, Massachusetts	1600 Osgood St.	1956	transmission equipment	1,565,000 sq. ft./ Closed and sold.
Oklahoma City Works	Oklahoma City, Oklahoma	7725 W Reno Ave	1961	payphones, switching equipment	Closed and sold.
Omaha Works	Omaha, Nebraska	132nd and L Streets	1958	crossbar, dial, and PBX equipment, cable, relays	"Two key buildings that were part of the original complex: Building 20 (the property's iconic office building) and Building 30 (a former manufacturing/warehouse facility)." were purchased upon the closure in November 2011. Closed and sold.
Orlando Works	Orlando, Florida	9701 and 9333 John Young Parkway	early 1980s	microelectronics	1,307,000 sq. ft. /later Agere Systems Closed 2005, demolished, and sold 2007.
Phoenix Works	Phoenix, Arizona	505 N. 51 Ave.	1967	cable and wire	850,000 sq. ft./ Closed and sold.
Reading Works	Reading, Pennsylvania	2525 North 12th St	1962	microelectronics	1,214,000 sq. ft./later Agere Systems Closed and sold.
Richmond Works	Richmond, Virginia	4500 Laburnum Ave	1973	printed circuit technology	400,000 sq. ft./ In 1979, Fortune Magazine designated as one of the 10 best-managed American factories. Sold in 1996 to Viasystems Group, Inc. and closed the circuit board plant. During Viasystems, the manufacturing operations ceased in June 2001 and the facility was idle up-to the sale on August 23, 2006. The new ownership, Laburnum Investments, LLC, planned the White Oak Village Shopping Center. Although, the site was sold, Lucent and Alcatel-Lucent were involved in the Environmental Protection Agency (EPA) remediation of chemicals underground from Western Electric/AT&T operations. Afterwards, when the EPA ordered remediation clean-up in 1996 under Lucent, several companies were later created and responsibility for the cleanup was the following: Agere in 2001, LSI in 2007, Avago in 2014, and Broadcom in 2016.
Shreveport Works	Shreveport, Louisiana	9595 Mansfield Rd	1967	business and consumer telephone sets, payphones	1,206,000 sq. ft./Closed and sold.
Winston-Salem Works	Winston-Salem, North Carolina	3300 Lexington Rd. S.E.	1954	broadband carrier equipment, inbound signaling, telephone and telegraph repeaters, capacitors, thin film resistors, sealed contacts, magnetic apparatus, mainly military and wave guide equipment	1,084,000/ Closed and sold. Redeveloped as luxury apartments.

=== Awards ===
- 1997, the Primetime Engineering Emmy Awards from the Academy of Television Arts and Sciences for work done by formerly AT&T Bell Labs and Microelectronics Group on the Grand Alliance (HDTV) project for digital television.
- 1998. the Adjunct Physics Director at Lucent Bell Labs, Horst Stormer, received the Nobel Prize in Physics with former AT&T Bell Labs scientists Daniel C. Tsui and Robert B. Laughlin. Their research work was done on fractional quantum hall effect during their tenure at AT&T Bell Labs.
- 1998, Lucent received the INFORMS Prize, for its work in the companies operations research, presented by Institute for Operations Research and the Management Sciences.
- 1999. the Wireless Networks Group at the Mount Olive, New Jersey Product Realization Center, received the 1999 New Jersey Governor's Gold Award for Performance Excellence.
- 2000, the Shingo Prize for Excellence in Manufacturing was awarded at the Mount Olive Product Realization Center.
