= Monique Canto-Sperber =

French philosopher (born 1954)

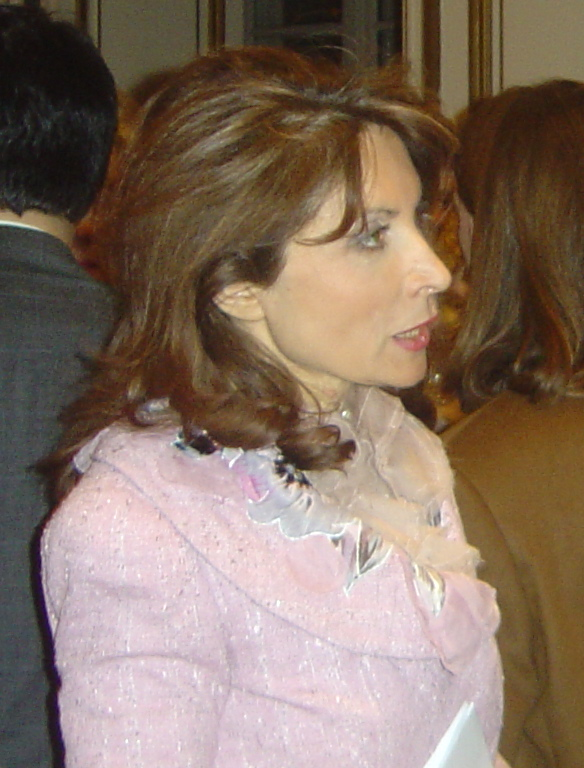

Director of the École normale supérieure
- In office 2005–2012
- Preceded by: Gabriel Ruget
- Succeeded by: Marc Mézard

Personal details
- Born: 14 May 1954 (age 71) Algeria
- Education: Lycée Condorcet
- Alma mater: École normale supérieure

Monique Canto-Sperber (born 1954) is a French philosopher. Her works, translated in several languages, are focused on ethics and contemporary political issues. A former director of the École normale supérieure from 2005 to 2012, she has been president of Paris Sciences et Lettres – Quartier latin, a French higher education and research institution, since 2012.

== Biography ==
Monique Canto-Sperber was born on May 14, 1954, in French Algeria and has been living in France since 1964. An alumnus of the Ecole normale supérieure de jeunes filles, she is Agrégée and holds a PhD in philosophy.

After teaching at the universities of Rouen and Amiens, she became Research Director at the CNRS in 1993. Between 2001 and 2004, she was a member of the Comité consultatif national d'éthique and served as its president from 2004 to 2007.

She produces the radio programme "Questions d'éthique" on France Culture, broadcast every Monday evening.

She is officier de la Légion d'honneur officier de l'ordre du Mérite et chevalier des Arts et des Lettres.

Her work in ancient philosophy is centred on ethical theory and epistemology; she has published several commented translations of Plato (Gorgias, Ion, Euthydème, Ménon) and various books. She has also taken an active part in the renewal of moral philosophy in France, with the creation in 1993 of a book collection by the Presses Universitaires de France.

== Direction of the ENS ==
Monique Canto-Sperber has been the head of the Ecole normale supérieure since 2005 (renewed in 2010). She has introduced the practice of scientific advisory committees in humanities and social sciences departments, created an International Council for Strategic Orientation, developed a specific ENS Diploma and started a rehabilitation of research spaces.

She has also encouraged the projection of the Ecole normale supérieure as an institution of research and higher education comparable to leading international research universities, rather than as a specific French creation. She has promoted the creation of a group of institutions called Paris Sciences et Lettres - Quartier latin. In February 2012, she was elected as the President of Paris Sciences et Lettres - Quartier latin.

== Direction of PSL ==
Paris Sciences et Lettres – Quartier latin (PSL) is a new research university, made of cooperative actions between the École normale supérieure, the Collège de France, ESPCI ParisTech, Chimie ParisTech, Paris Observatory, Paris Dauphine University and the Curie Institute.

== Philosophy ==
=== Ethics ===
A specialist of ancient philosophy, Monique Canto-Sperber has worked on and translated dialogues of Plato. In her book, Greek Ethics, Monique Canto-Sperber argues notably that the contemporary conception of Greek moral philosophy as essentially forms of eudemonism is an artefact and that contemporary debates only present a very partial view on the topic. Her works stress the practical life enhancing aspect of moral philosophy using examples from the arts and literature.

She has also played an important role in the introduction in France of contemporary debates in Anglo-American philosophy.

She has edited at the Presses Universitaires de France a Dictionnaire d'éthique et de philosophie morale, with numerous French and international specialists, on major issues of moral philosophy.

=== Political philosophy ===
During the last 15 years, Monique Canto-Sperber has also written important works of political philosophy. In books such as Rules of Freedom or Does liberalism need to be saved?, she offers an analysis of liberalism that attempt to give the notion a new legitimacy in progressive political thinking.

Recent books such as L'Idée de guerre juste and La Morale du monde offer her vision of international relations.

== Bibliography ==
- Les paradoxes de la connaissance. Essais sur le Ménon de Platon, 1991
- La philosophie morale britannique, 1994
- Direction du Dictionnaire d'éthique et de philosophie morale, 2004
- (dir.) Philosophie grecque, en collaboration avec J. Barnes, L. Brisson, J. Brunschwig, et G. Vlastos, 1997.
- Éthiques grecques, 2001
- L'Inquiétude morale et la Vie humaine, 2002
- Le Socialisme libéral. Une anthologie (Europe - États-Unis), 2003
- Les Règles de la liberté, 2003
- Le Bien, la Guerre et la Terreur. Pour une morale internationale, 2005
- Faut-il sauver le libéralisme ?, avec Nicolas Tenzer, 2006
- Le Libéralisme et la gauche, 2008
- "L'idée de guerre juste", 2010
- "La Morale du monde", 2010
