= Udice French Research Universities =

- Formation: 2008; 18 years ago (CURIF Group); 2020; 6 years ago (Udice Group)
- Type: Association of France-based universities
- Headquarters: 23 rue Louis Legrand; Paris
- Region served: France
- Members: 13: Aix-Marseille University; Sorbonne University; Claude Bernard University Lyon 1; Côte d'Azur University; University of Bordeaux; Paris Cité University; University of Strasbourg; Grenoble Alpes University; Paris Saclay University; PSL University; University of Lorraine; University of Montpellier; Polytechnic Institute of Paris
- Key people: Michel Deneken
- Website: https://www.udice.org

The Udice Group is a self-selected association of thirteen public research universities and their seventeen Grandes Écoles in France. The group is headquartered in Paris and was established in 2020. It is the partial successor to the CURIF Group (coordination of French research-intensive universities) created in 2008 and dissolved in 2020. It is chaired by Michel Deneken, president of the University of Strasbourg.

Nine of these prestigious research universities have received funding from the French government's “Investments d'avenir” program under the “Initiatives of Excellence” (IDEX) scheme.

The Udice Group is home to one-third of France's doctoral students, two-thirds of the world's most cited French scientific publications, a total budget of €6.5 billion, and eight university hospital groups. It is a network comparable to what already exists in the USA (Association of American Universities) and Europe. In the UK, the equivalent of the Udice Group is the Russell Group; and in Germany, it is the nine universities to which the government has awarded the label of excellence.

== History ==
The CURIF Group (coordination of French research-intensive universities) was created in 2008 and dissolved in 2020.

In 1 October 2020, at a press conference, the ten presidents of French research universities announce the creation of the Udice Group, bringing together four Paris universities - Sorbonne University, Paris Cité University, Paris-Saclay University and PSL University - as well as Aix-Marseille University (amU), Claude Bernard University Lyon 1 (UCBL), Côte d'Azur University, University of Bordeaux, University of Strasbourg and Grenoble Alpes University. Similar organizational models exist in most major European countries. They enhance the attractiveness of national universities, and play a key role in integrating the missions of research, education and innovation.

On June 19, 2024, the Udice Group was extended to include three new members: the University of Lorraine, the University of Montpellier (one of the oldest universities in the world, established in 1220) and the Polytechnic Institute of Paris (and its four Grandes Écoles).

== Economic contribution ==
According to a study by Biggar Economics, commissioned by the Udice Group, these ten universities contribute 40 billion euros in added value and over 380,000 jobs to the French economy.

== Activities ==
In November 2021, the Udice Group signs a cooperation agreement with Bpifrance (the French public investment bank). The aim is to amplify the creation of Deep tech startups from research laboratories. The Deep tech plan operated by Bpifrance targets 500 Deep tech startups a year by 2030.

In March 2022, the Udice Group is organizing its first forum in Marseille, entitled “Research universities, the driving force behind a Europe of science”.

== Position statements ==
In March 2020, the presidents of the Udice Group member universities alerted the media to student conditions during the pandemic.

== Members ==
=== Founder universities ===
1. Aix-Marseille University (amU)
2. Sorbonne University, Paris
  - and its Grandes Écoles:
  - CELSA Graduate School of Communication and Journalism
3. Claude Bernard University Lyon 1 (UCBL)
4. Côte d'Azur University, Nice (UCA)
5. University of Bordeaux
6. Paris Cité University
7. University of Strasbourg (Unistra)
8. Grenoble Alpes University (UGA)
  - and its Grandes Écoles:
  - Grenoble Institute of Technology (Grenoble INP)
  - Grenoble School of Architecture
  - Grenoble Institute of Political Studies (Sciences Po Grenoble)
9. Paris Saclay University
  - and its Grandes Écoles:
  - CentraleSupélec
  - École normale supérieure Paris-Saclay
  - Institut d'optique Graduate School
  - AgroParisTech
  - and its associate universities:
  - University of Versailles Saint-Quentin-en-Yvelines (UVSQ)
  - University of Évry
10. PSL University, Paris
  - and its Grandes Écoles:
  - Paris Technical Institute of Chemistry - PSL (Chimie ParisTech)
  - National Academy of Dramatic Arts - PSL (CNSAD)
  - École Nationale des Chartes
  - École Normale Supérieure - PSL (ENS)
  - École Pratique des Hautes Études - PSL (EPHE)
  - Paris School of Industrial Physics and Chemistry - PSL (ESPCI)
  - Paris School of Mines - PSL (Mines Paris)
  - Paris Observatory - PSL
  - Paris Dauphine University
11. University of Lorraine, Metz, Nancy (new member since 2024)
  - and its Grandes Écoles:
  - Lorraine Institute of Technology
    - Nancy School of Mines
    - Telecom Nancy
12. University of Montpellier (new member since 2024)
13. Polytechnic Institute of Paris (new member since 2024)
  - and its Grandes Écoles:
  - École Polytechnique
  - Telecom Paris
  - Telecom SudParis
  - ENSTA Paris
  - ENSAE Paris
  - École des Ponts et Chaussées
