= Rankings of universities in the European Union =

Rankings of universities in the European Union have been published by Quacquarelli Symonds and the Shanghai Ranking Consultancy (ARWU).

== ARWU Ranking ==
Rankings of Universities have been published by the Academic Ranking of World Universities 2024. (without universities in countries outside the European Union)

American universities largely dominate the Shanghai Ranking, with almost half of the top 100 universities. The European Union comes second, with 19 universities in the top 100 of the Academic World University Rankings 2022 and 21 ranked universities, followed by the United Kingdom, said the European Commission, which has published a note on this classification in November 2021. Canada, Australia, China and Switzerland are also well represented in the top 100.

Top 20 (2023)	University	Country
1	Paris Saclay University	France
2	University of Copenhagen	Denmark
3	Karolinska Institute	Sweden
4	Paris Sciences et Lettres University	France
5	Sorbonne University	France
6	Utrecht University	Netherlands
7	Heidelberg University	Germany
8	Technical University of Munich	Germany
9	LMU Munich	Germany
10	University of Bonn	Germany
11	Paris Cité University	France
12	University of Groningen	Netherlands
13	Aarhus University	Denmark
14	Uppsala University	Sweden
15	Ghent University	Belgium
16	KU Leuven	Belgium
17	Erasmus University Rotterdam	Netherlands
18	Stockholm University	Sweden
19	Leiden University	Netherlands
20	Radboud University Nijmegen	Netherlands

== QS Ranking ==
Rankings of Universities have been published by QS World University Rankings. (apply filter by location "Europe" without universities in countries outside the European Union)

Top 20 (2025)	Top 20 (2024)	University	Country
1	1	Paris Sciences et Lettres University	France
2	2	Technical University of Munich	Germany
3	7	Polytechnic Institute of Paris	France
4	3	Delft University of Technology	Netherlands
5	5	University of Amsterdam	Netherlands
6	4	LMU Munich	Germany
7	8	KU Leuven	Belgium
8	12	Sorbonne University	France
9	13	Paris Saclay University	France
10	11	KTH Royal Institute of Technology	Sweden
11	9	Lund University	Sweden
12	6	Heidelberg University	Germany
13	14	Trinity College Dublin	Ireland
14	17	Free University of Berlin	Germany
15	31	RWTH Aachen University	Germany
16	15	University of Copenhagen	Denmark
17	34	Karlsruhe Institute of Technology	Germany
18	10	Uppsala University	Sweden
19	19	Utrecht University	Netherlands
20	39	Technical University of Denmark	Denmark

== See also ==
Ranking of universities in the United Kingdom
