= Centre régional des œuvres universitaires et scolaires =

In higher education in France the Centres Régionaux des Oeuvres Universitaires et Scolaires (en: Regional Centers for University and School Activities) or CROUS, founded in 1955, are regional organisations providing student bursaries, university halls of residence, student restaurants, reception of foreign students, and student cultural activities.

Accommodation is offered in all university cities, such as Paris, Nantes, Lyon, Toulouse, Bordeaux, Montpellier, Besançon, etc. For instance, the Grenoble education authority helps students find accommodation in the university cities of Grenoble, Chambéry, Valence and Annecy.

== List of Regional CROUS ==
The CROUS are geographically organized according to their local academis, the regional education authority, around the major university cities

french Academies map

- Crous of Aix–Marseille Avignon
- Crous of Amiens Picardie
- Crous of Antilles Guyane
- Crous of Bordeaux Aquitaine
- Crous of Bourgogne-Franche-Comté (union of the Crous of Besançon and Dijon)
- Crous of Clermont Auvergne
- Crous of Corse
- Crous of Créteil
- Crous of Grenoble Alpes
- Crous of Lille
- Crous of Limoges
- Crous of Lorraine
- Crous of Lyon
- Crous of Montpellier Occitanie
- Crous of Nantes Pays de la Loire
- Crous of Nice–Toulon
- Crous of Normandie (union of the Crous of Caen and of Rouen)
- Crous of Orléans–Tours
- Crous of Paris
- Crous of Poitiers
- Crous of Reims
- Crous of Rennes Bretagne
- Crous of La Réunion Mayotte
- Crous of Strasbourg
- Crous of Toulouse Occitanie
- Crous of Versailles
