= Institut Pierre-Gilles de Gennes =

Paris Sciences et Lettres University

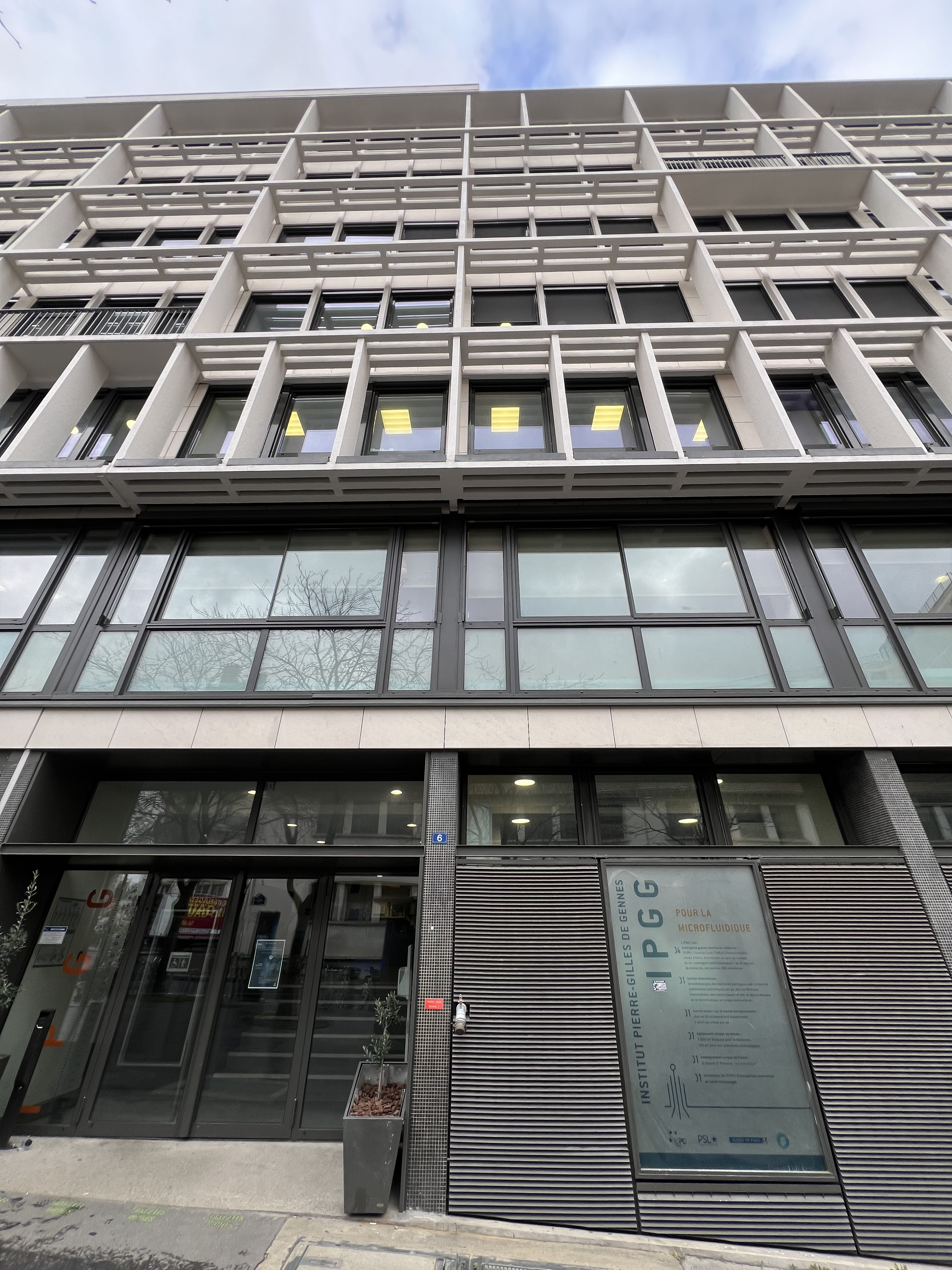
- Institut Pierre-Gilles de Gennes headquarters
- Founder: Paris Sciences et Lettres University
- Established: 2016
- Mission: Fundamental research
- Location: Paris, France
- Coordinates: 48.841739654541016°N 2.348762273788452°E
- Website: https://www.institut-pgg.fr/
- Position in France

The Institut Pierre-Gilles de Gennes (IPGG) or Institut Pierre-Gilles de Gennes pour la microfluidique is a French research center dedicated to microfluidics and its applications at PSL University.

The institute brings together sixteen research teams attached to the Curie Institute, Chimie ParisTech, the École normale supérieure and ESPCI Paris, all four members of PSL University.

Based on rue Jean-Calvin in Paris, it is named after the French physicist and Nobel Prize winner in physics Pierre-Gilles de Gennes. The building housing the IPGG has been inaugurated on March 14, 2016, in the presence of the President of the French Republic François Hollande and the Mayor of Paris Anne Hidalgo. This building accommodates eight of the sixteen IPGG teams, the ESPCI Paris PC'up incubator, a 150-seat amphitheater and a microfabrication technological platform.

Managed from 2010 to 2018 by Patrick Tabeling, the IPGG has been managed since January 1, 2019 by Lydéric Bocquet.

The IPGG has designed a Master's degree level program dedicated to microfluidics, its concepts, applications and innovations. This training is carried out in partnership with the master's degree in Physics of Complex Systems (Paris-Saclay University, Université Paris Cité, Sorbonne University) and Materials Science and Engineering (PSL University).
