= Tabeling =

Tabeling is a surname. Notable people with the surname include:

- Iris Tabeling (born 1991), Dutch badminton player
- Patrick Tabeling, French physicist
- Robin Tabeling (born 1994), Dutch badminton player
