= Condorcet Campus =

Condorcet Campus Campus Condorcet Paris-Aubervilliers
- Campus of the universities of Paris
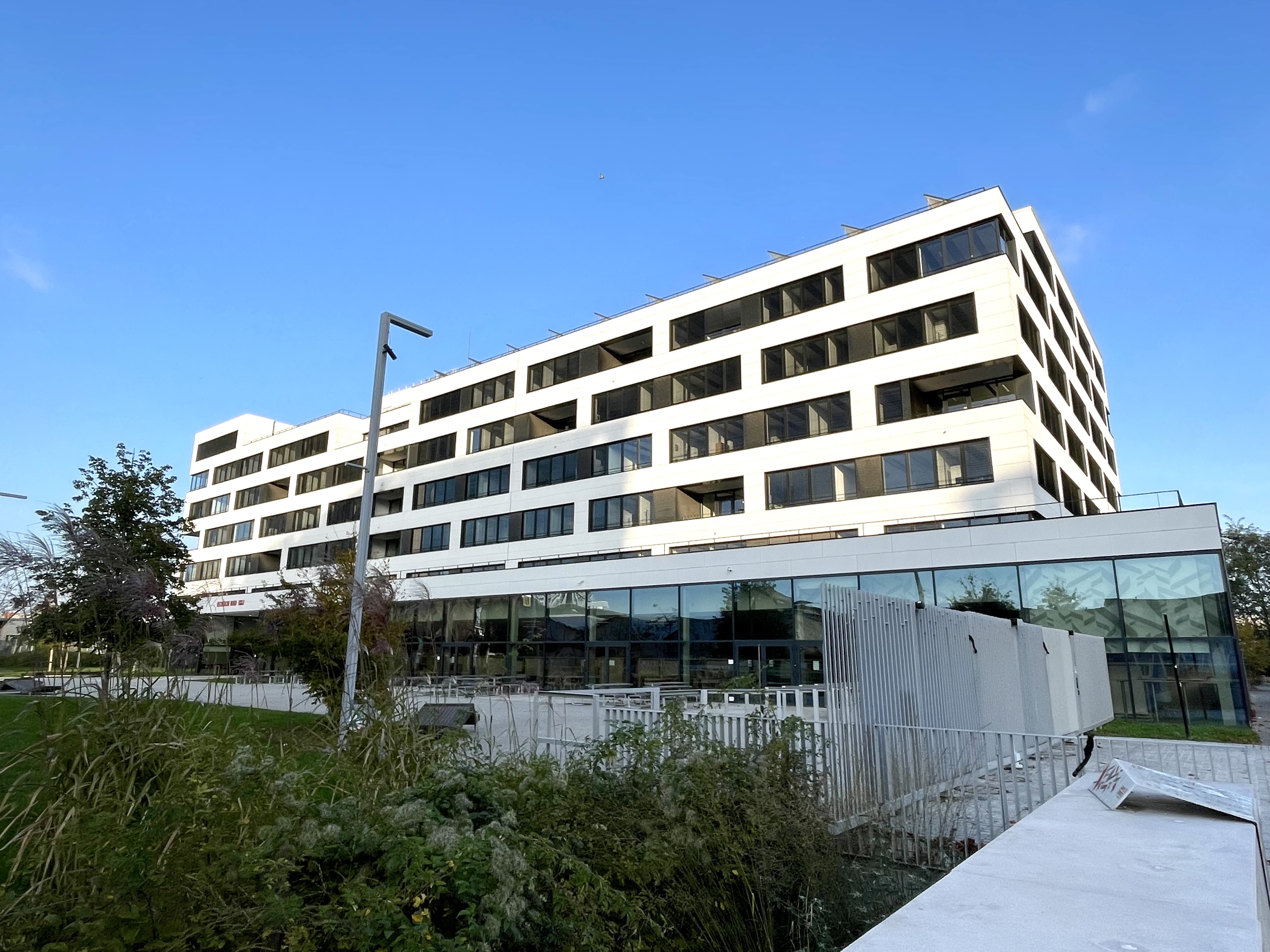
- The Condorcet Campus Research North Building, in 2024.
- Interactive map of Condorcet Campus
- Country: France
- Region: Île-de-France
- Villes: Aubervilliers and Paris
- Quartiers: La Plaine Saint-Denis and Porte de la Chapelle

The Condorcet Paris-Aubervilliers Campus, known as Condorcet Campus, is an inter-university campus of the universities of Paris, located between Porte de la Chapelle in Paris and La Plaine Saint-Denis in Aubervilliers and inaugurated in 2019.

Eleven research universities and institutions are taking part. The campus is dedicated to the humanities and social sciences.

== History ==
The project was born in 2008 from the alliance of the Panthéon-Sorbonne University, the University of Paris 8, Sorbonne Paris North University, EHESS and PSL University with EPHE and École des Chartes. They are joined by CNRS, INED, the foundation Maison des sciences de l'homme and Sorbonne Nouvelle University. It is managed by the Condorcet Foundation, chaired from 2009 to 2016 by Jean-Claude Waquet, formerly President of the École pratique des hautes études. Paris Nanterre University joined the Condorcet project in 2018.

The cost is €40 million in 2010, rising to €110 million in 2014.

The campus is one of ten selected in July 2008 by the French Ministry of Higher Education as part of the Campus plan. The operation is supported by the local authorities concerned (Aubervilliers, Plaine Commune, City of Paris, Seine-Saint-Denis General Council, Île-de-France region).

Construction of the Aubervilliers site began in 2018, and that of Porte de la Chapelle in 2023.

== Administrative organization ==
In 2020, the member institutions are:

- the Panthéon-Sorbonne University;
- the Sorbonne Nouvelle University;
- the University of Paris 8 Vincennes-Saint-Denis;
- the Paris Nanterre University;
- the Sorbonne Paris North University;
- the PSL University with its two Grandes Écoles:
  - the École Nationale des Chartes (ENC-PSL);
  - the École Pratique des Hautes Études (EPHE-PSL);
- the CNRS - French National Centre for Scientific Research,
- the École des Hautes Études en Sciences Sociales (EHESS),
- the foundation Maison des Sciences de l'Homme (FMSH);
- and the Institut National d'Études Démographiques (INED);

Since June 22, 2022, the President of the Condorcet Campus public body has been Pierre-Paul Zalio. The main Condorcet Campus site is located in Aubervilliers. By 2022, 12,000 researchers and doctoral students will be working there in 116 research units and as many teaching rooms, occupying a dozen buildings (including those of the INED) on more than six hectares, which will also include a library of one million books, known as the “Humathèque Condorcet”, designed by architect Elizabeth de Portzamparc.

An 8,000 m2 building for PSL's École Pratique des Hautes Études will be completed by 2025, followed by new premises for the École des Hautes Études en Sciences Sociales and the fondation Maison des Sciences de l'Homme by 2029-2030. This human sciences research cluster will have taken almost two decades and 500 million euros to complete, due to the reluctance of certain institutions to move away from the center of Paris, and the various ups and downs of architectural competitions and site management.

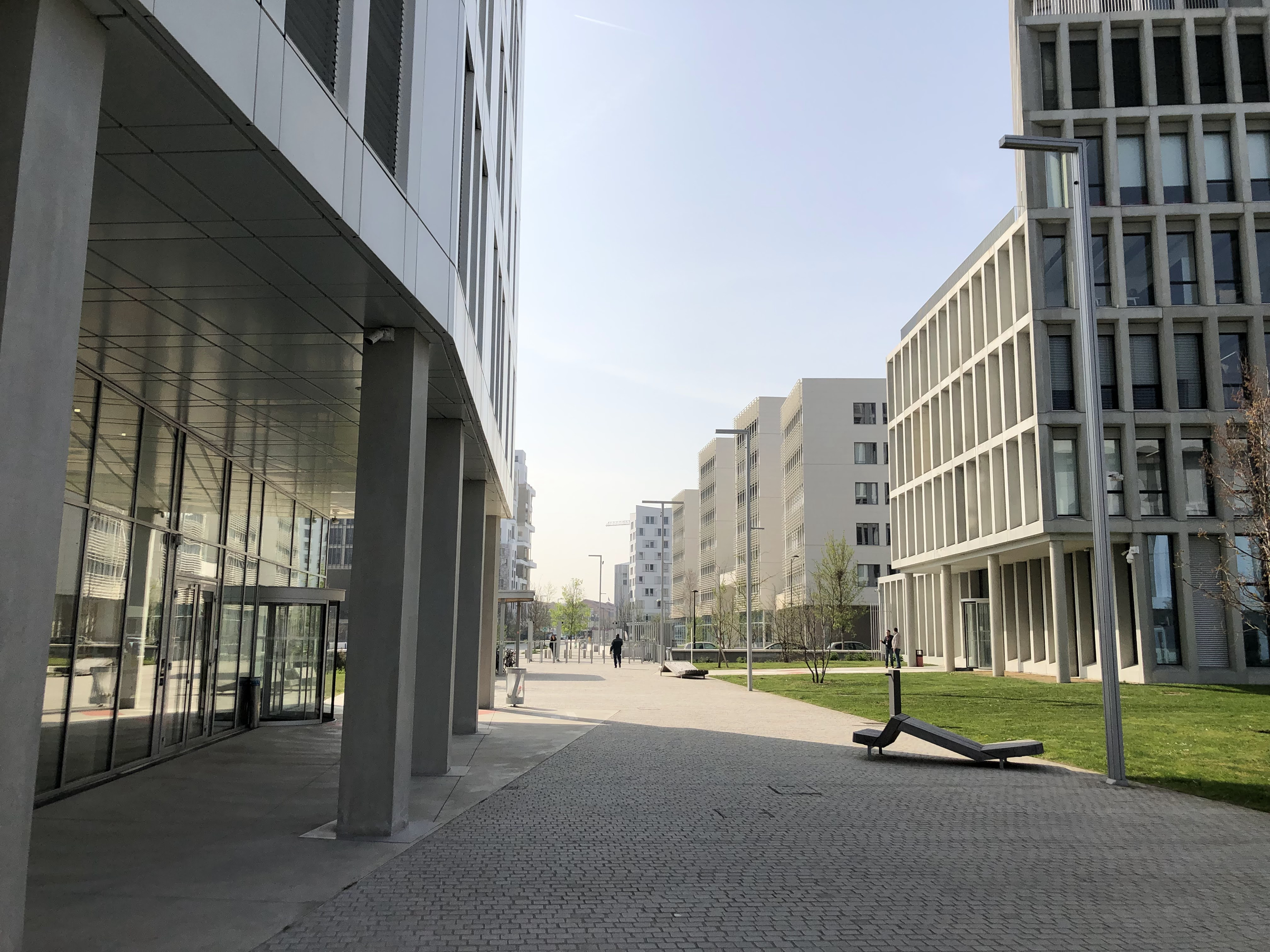
The Humanities Avenue, in 2022.

Planned to start in 2021, but delayed to 2023 by an unsuccessful initial call for proposals, the development of the Porte de la Chapelle site in Paris, on the site of the former Dubois railway station, is due to be handed over at the start of the 2025 academic year. Its 20,000 m2 of classrooms, library and gardens will accommodate 3,500 undergraduate students at the University of Paris 1, and was designed by architects Françoise Mauffret and Jean Guervilly.

== See also ==
- CNRS
- PSL University
- Sorbonne-Paris-Cité Alliance
