= Axel Kahn =

French geneticist (1944–2021)

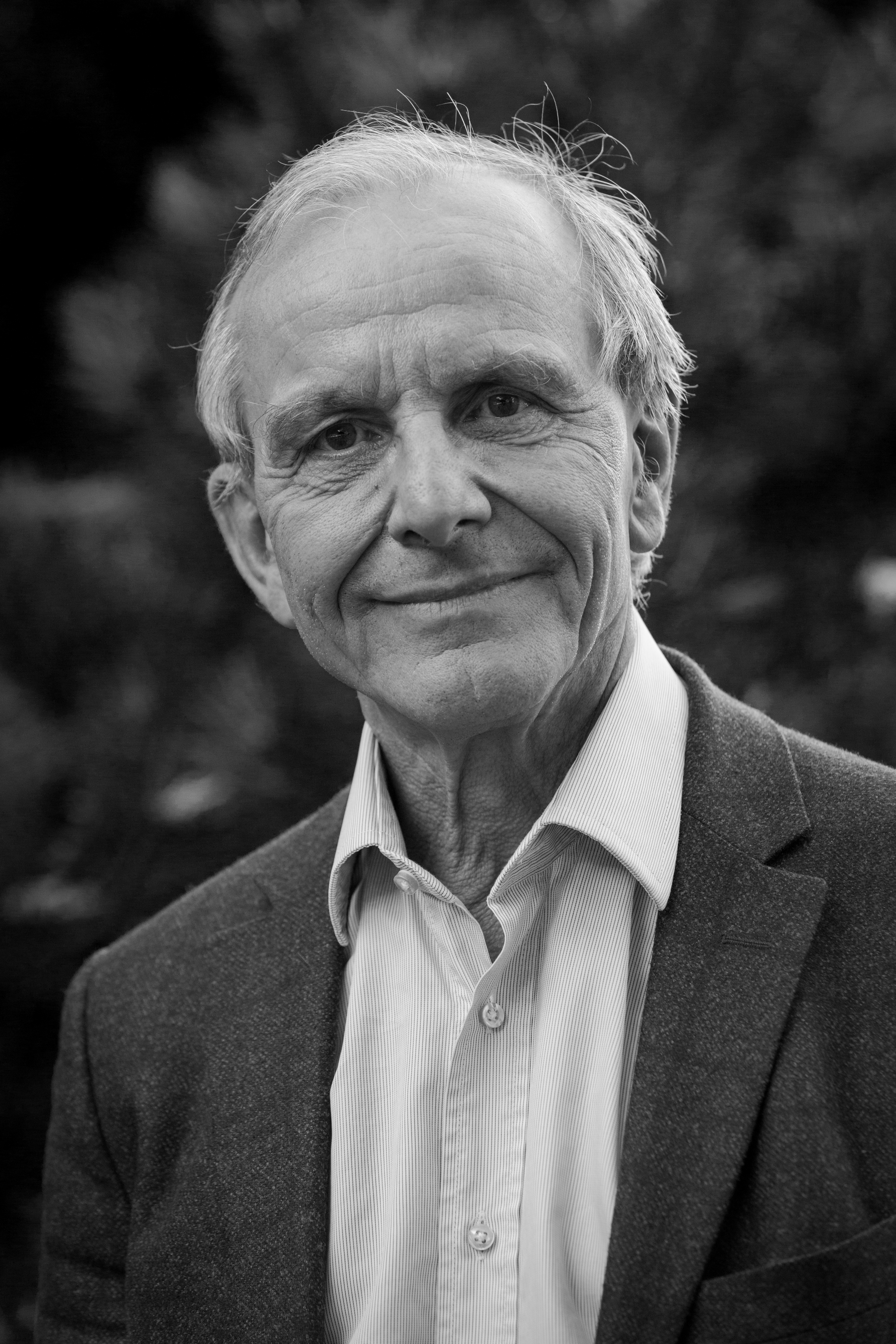
- Kahn in 2015

President of Paris Descartes University
- In office 2007–2011
- Preceded by: Jean-François Dhainaut
- Succeeded by: Frédéric Dardel

Personal details
- Born: 5 September 1944 Le Petit-Pressigny, Centre, France
- Died: 6 July 2021 (aged 76) Paris, France
- Relatives: Jean-François Kahn; Olivier Kahn (brothers)
- Education: Lycée Buffon
- Alma mater: University of Paris
- Profession: Physician

Axel Kahn (French pronunciation: [aksɛl kan]; 5 September 1944 – 6 July 2021) was a French geneticist. He was the brother of the journalist Jean-François Kahn and the chemist Olivier Kahn. He was a member of the French National Consultative Ethics Committee from 1992 to 2004 and worked in gene therapy. He first entered the INSERM with a specialization in biochemistry. He was named in 2002 as a counsellor for biosciences and biotechnologies matters by the European Commission. Head of French laboratories specialized in biomedical sciences between years 1984 and 2007, he was elected President of the Paris Descartes University in December 2007, as the sole candidate.

Kahn is known in France for his appearances in the media where he attempts to explain genetics and ethics to the public. As a civil servant, he was the head of the committee in charge of genetically modified crops for Europe.

== Views on science ==
Kahn, the editor of French biomedical journal (Médecine/Sciences; 2005 Impact Factor: 0.541), said in 1999 that "80 to 90 percent of what is published [in scientific journals] is of little real interest" and most journals are consulted infrequently.

Kahn has said that Oxford biologist Richard Dawkins's view of the "selfish gene" and genetic determinism is incorrect, saying: "Personally, I am strongly against the theory of ultra-genetic determinism and the Dawkins theory of 'the egoistic gene'."

In 2004, Kahn signed a petition and threatened to resign from his post as head of the Paris-based, publicly financed Cochin Institute, due to cuts in government spending on research.

== Views and positions on medical procedures ==
=== Gene therapies ===
Kahn was against germline gene therapies, saying that they have no therapeutical value, and he was working to outlaw them worldwide through the World Health Organization.

=== Stem cells ===
He has said of stem cells as a therapy, "Science alone is not sufficient for making decisions on stem cells, but we cannot discuss the ethical issues without clarifying the scientific facts."

Kahn has said that embryos which are kept frozen after in vitro fertilization procedures and will be destroyed anyway should be used for scientific advances, because whether or not the embryo has the potential to be human, at that point its only fate is to be used for research or destruction and its only chance to contribute to a "human project" is to help with scientific research. This view (Kahn referred to himself as a humanist) has been viewed by some religious theorists as disrespectful of the embryos.

=== Infertility treatments ===
In 1995, Kahn was a notable opponent of intracytoplasmic sperm injection, which he saw as an experimental treatment not to be used by those with infertility, which was not serious enough to justify the risks he perceived the procedure as having.

Kahn has also spoken out against family members carrying children for other family members who are infertile. In speaking out against the case of a 62-year-old Frenchwoman who gave birth after being implanted in the United States with the sperm of her brother, Kahn protested what he called "social incest" and continued, "The most important thing is that doctors were involved in this process, and they did it because they were paid handsomely."

=== Cloning ===
Kahn has said: "But, from the ethical point of view, I'm totally opposed -for some reasons- to the legitimisation of the cloning-based reproduction of human beings. This authorisation would entitle some individuals to create human beings in their own image… This kind of subjection -even though it is only corporal- is intolerable. What could give somebody the right to choose the sex, the eyes' or hair's colour, the chin's shape or any other characteristic of a human being? As a consequence, I see no reason for legitimating reproductive cloning. As regards therapeutic cloning, a problem can be pointed out: before making a supposedly therapeutic cloning, a human-cloning technique must be found."

He has also said that therapeutic cloning simply will not work.

== Political positions ==
Kahn has said that there can be no lasting state of Israel in its current location - "Demography, law and the uneasy conscience of the West preclude it." He called for the boycott of Israeli products.

== Books authored ==
- Transgenic Plants in Agriculture
- Copies conformes – Le clonage en question (1998)
- Et l'homme dans tout ça ? (And man in all of this?), by Axel Kahn (with Fabrice Papillon, 2000), pub. Nil, Paris, 2001
- Raisonnable et humain? (2004)
- Le Secret de la salamandre (with Fabrice Papillon, 2005)
- L'avenir n'est pas écrit ("Future is Not Yet Written")
- L'Homme, le Bien, le Mal. Une morale sans transcendance, by Axel Kahn and Christian Godin, Stock edition, Paris, 2008, ISBN 2-234-05975-5.

== Awards and honors ==
- Lauréat of the Académie Nationale de Médecine
- Medal of Francophony of the Académie Française
- CNRS Silver Medal
- Doctorat Honoris Causa from the Université Catholique de Louvain, the University of Liège, the Université de Montréal, the Université Laval and the Université de Sherbrooke.
- Officier of the Order of Legion of Honour
- Chevalier of the Ordre des Arts et des Lettres

== Death ==
Kahn died of bone cancer on 6 July 2021 in Paris at the age of 76.
