= Olivier Kahn =

French chemist (1942–1999)

- Born: 13 September 1942; Paris, France
- Died: 8 December 1999 (aged 57); Paris, France
- Education: Chimie ParisTech
- Occupation: Chemist
- Relatives: Jean-François Kahn, Axel Kahn (brothers)

Olivier Kahn (13 September 1942 – 8 December 1999) was a French chemist. He was the brother of the geneticist Axel Kahn and the journalist Jean-François Kahn.

Kahn studied at Chimie ParisTech in Paris and received his PhD for work on metal-organic compounds with Michaël Bigorgne in 1969. After a postdoctoral position at the University of East Anglia with Sydney Kettle he became professor at the University of Paris-Sud in 1976. He stayed there until he changed position and became professor at the University of Bordeaux in 1995. He held that position until his death in 1999.
