= Paris Sciences et Lettres University =

French university created in 2019

- Université Paris Sciences et Lettres
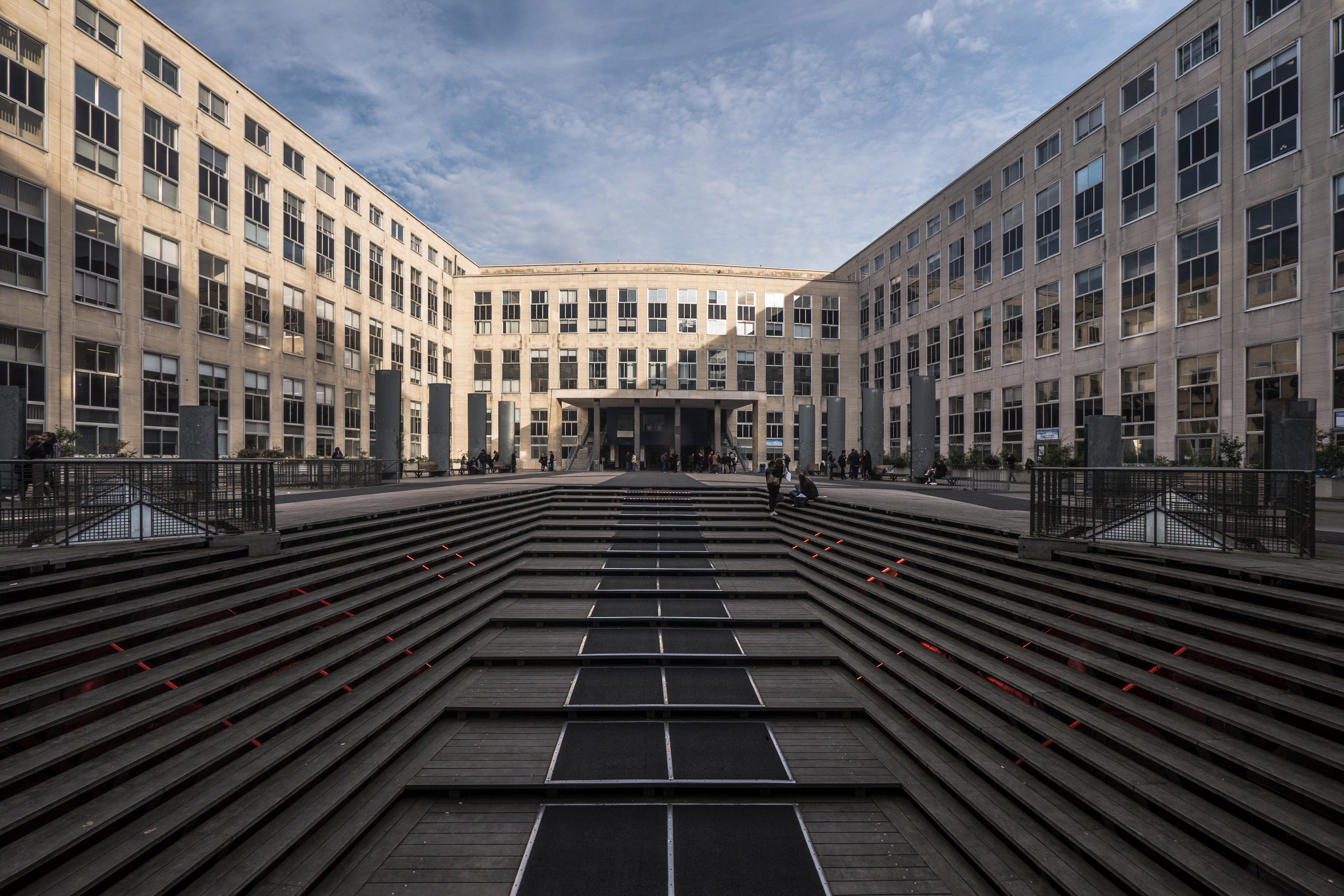
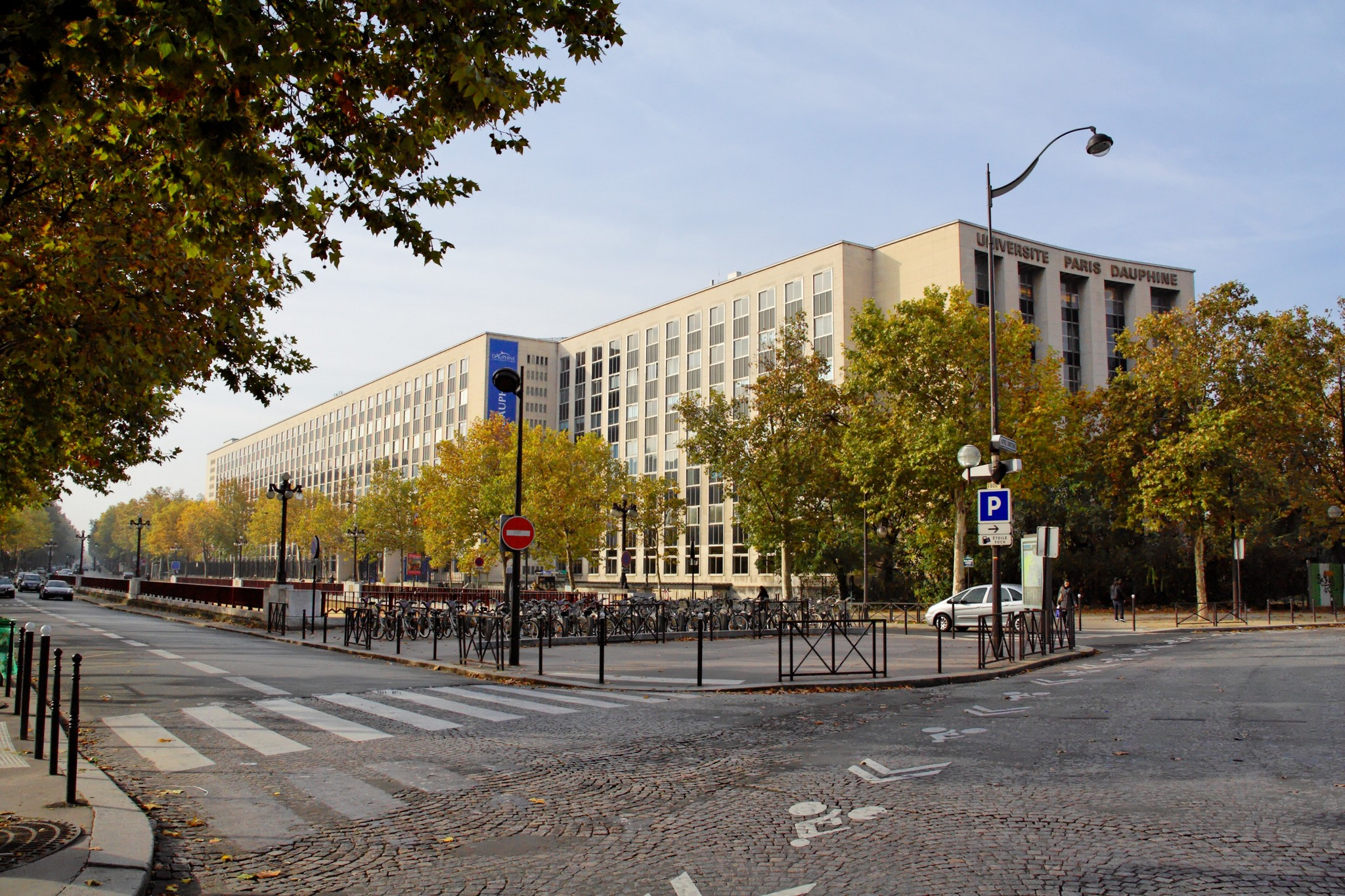
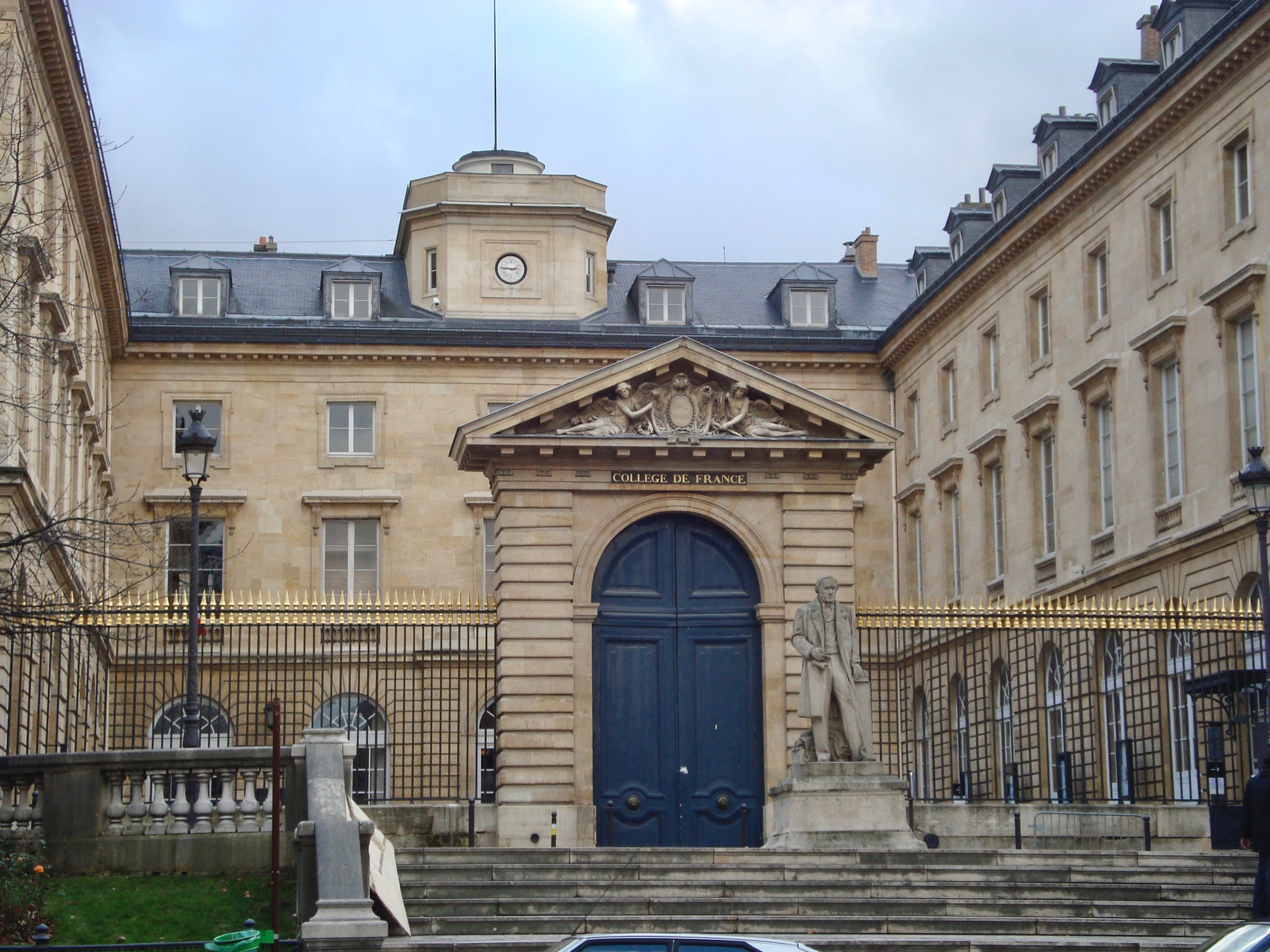
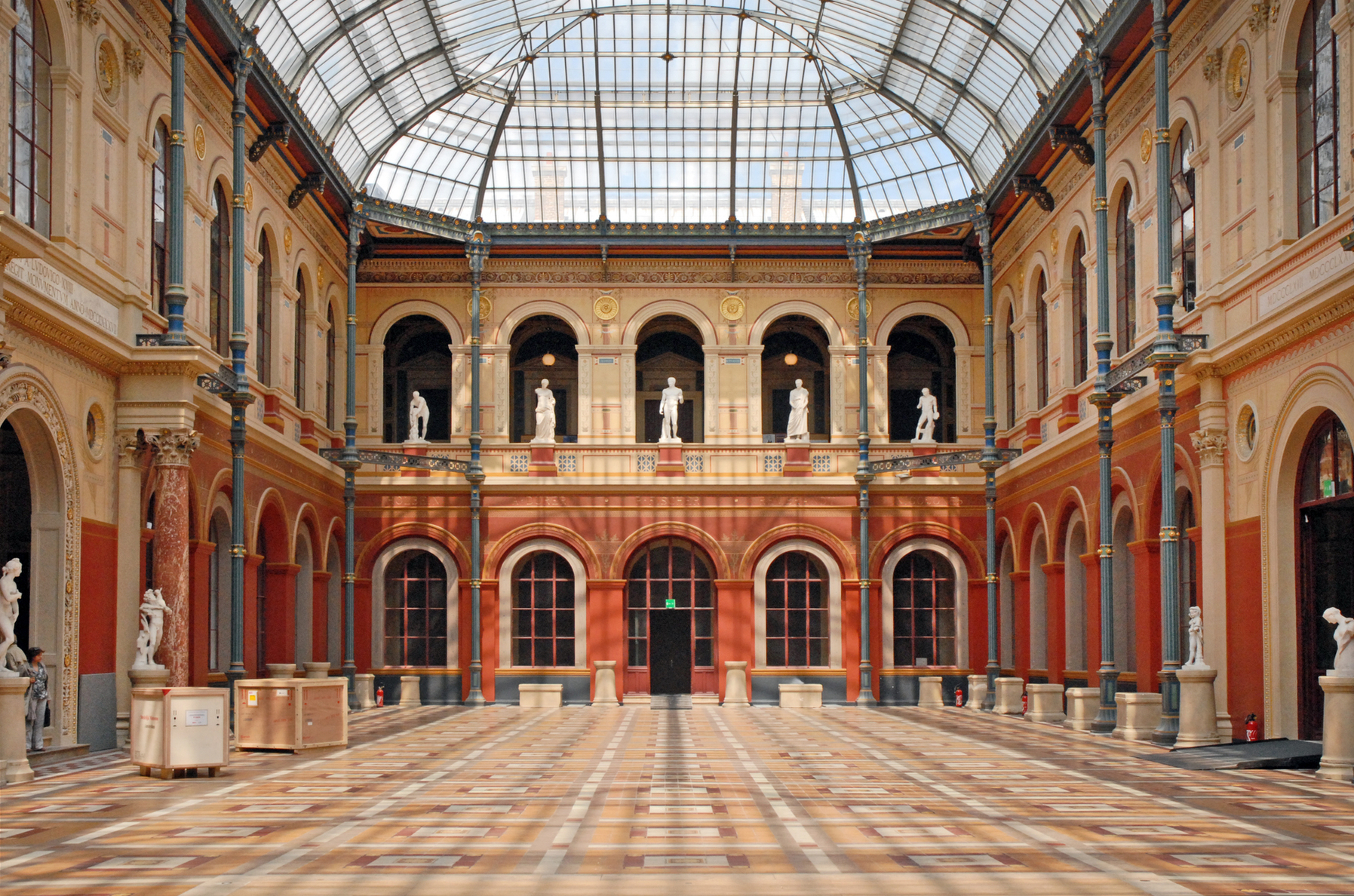
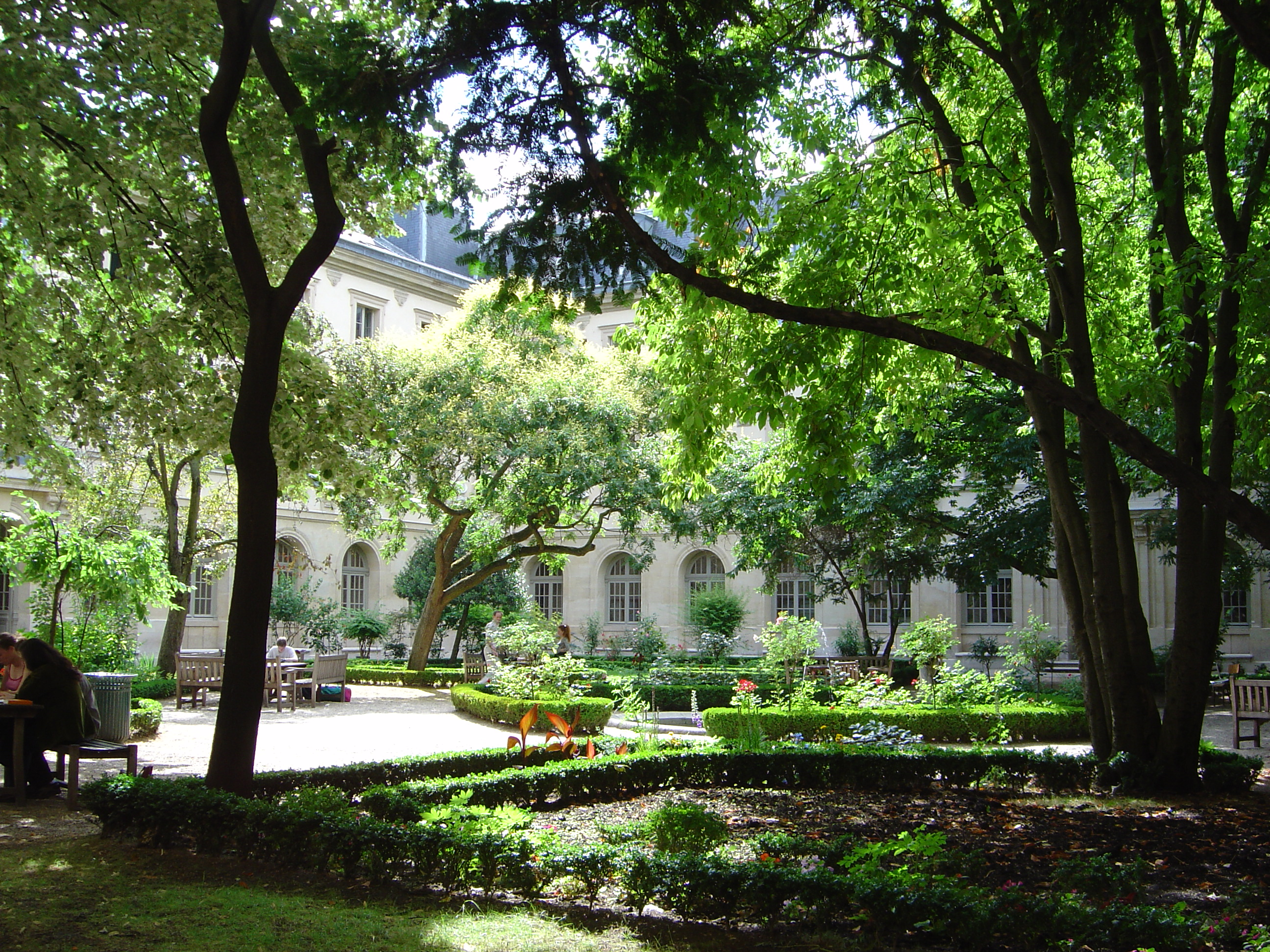
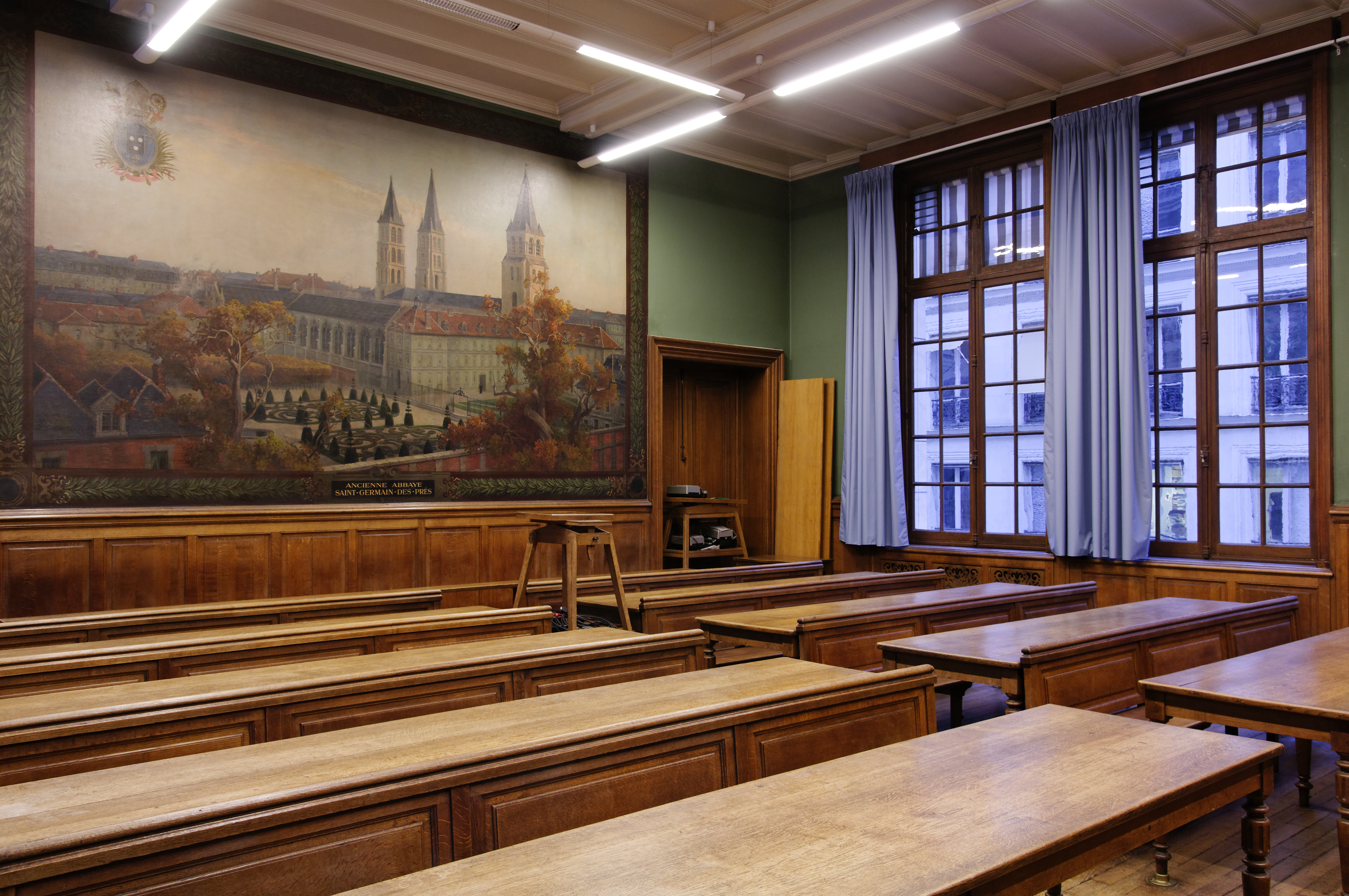
- Other name: PSL University
- Motto: Sapere Aude
- Motto in English: Dare to know
- Type: Public collegiate research university
- Established: 2010; 16 years ago (1530 for its oldest constituent college, the Collège de France)
- Academic affiliations: Udice Group; TPC
- Endowment: €750 million
- President: El-Mouhoub Mouhoud
- Faculty: 2,900
- Students: 17,000
- Location: Paris, France; 48°51′16.8″N 2°20′16.1″E
- Campus: Quartier latin, Condorcet Campus, Jourdan, Porte Dauphine, Meudon
- Website: www.psl.eu/en
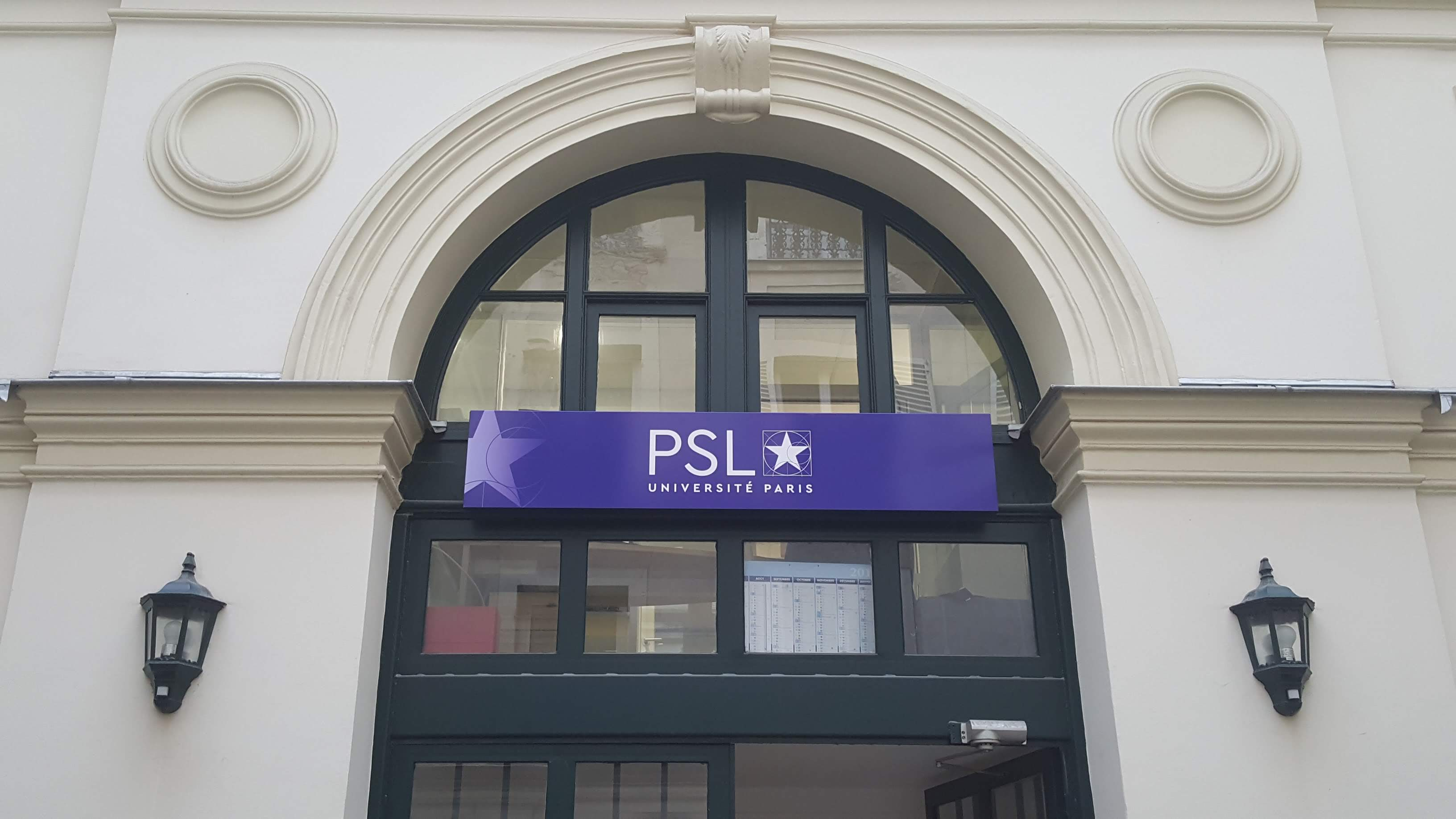

The Paris Sciences et Lettres University (French: Université Paris Sciences et Lettres), also known as PSL University, is a public research university and grand établissement based in Paris, France. It was established in 2010 and formally created as a university in 2019. It is a collegiate university with 11 constituent schools, with the oldest founded in 1530. PSL is located in central Paris, with its main sites in the Latin Quarter, at the Montagne Sainte-Geneviève Campus, at the Jourdan Campus, at Dauphine Campus, at Condorcet Campus, and at Carré Richelieu.

PSL awards Bachelor's, Master's, and PhD diplomas for its constituent schools and institutes. It offers an education based on research and interdisciplinary instruction, and its 17,000 students have access to a broad range of disciplines in science, engineering, humanities, social sciences, fine art and performing arts.

PSL alumni and staff include 28 Nobel laureates, 11 Fields Medalists, 3 Abel laureates, 49 CNRS Gold Medalists, 50 César winners and 79 Molière winners.

== History ==
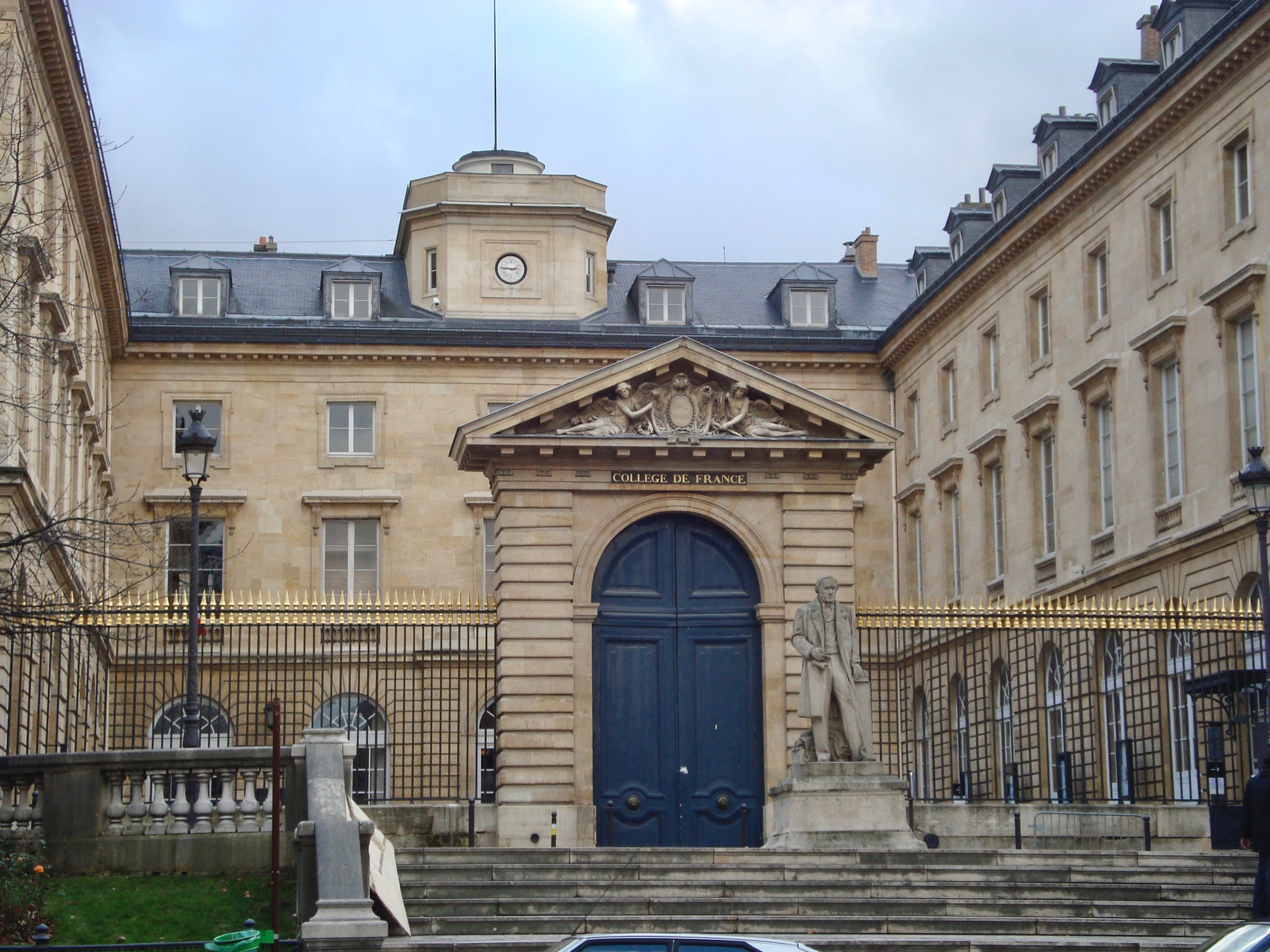
Collège de France, one leading college of PSL University

In 2004, institutions in the Latin Quarter began thinking of how to join forces to boost their international visibility. The French law on research promulgated in 2006, which encouraged the formation of research networks (in various forms including PRES and RTRA), paved the way for new projects such as Paris Universitas, PRES ParisTech and an early version of the PSL project. This new organization combined five institutions of higher education in the Latin Quarter: Chimie ParisTech, Collège de France, École normale supérieure (Paris), École supérieure de Physique et de Chimie industrielles de la ville de Paris (ESPCI Paris), and Observatoire de Paris. Together, they adopted the status of a scientific cooperation foundation (FCS) (fr). The new entity, called "Paris Sciences et Lettres – Quartier Latin", was initially conceived as a scientific alliance. In 2011, the five institutions submitted a joint application for the Initiatives for Excellence (IDEX) as part of France's Investing for the Future program (PIA), causing the project to evolve into a new form of French university. This university would have 70% of its students at the Master's and PhD level and offer a Bachelor's program, with an emphasis on equal opportunity students (40% scholarship students in the CPES multidisciplinary preparatory class).

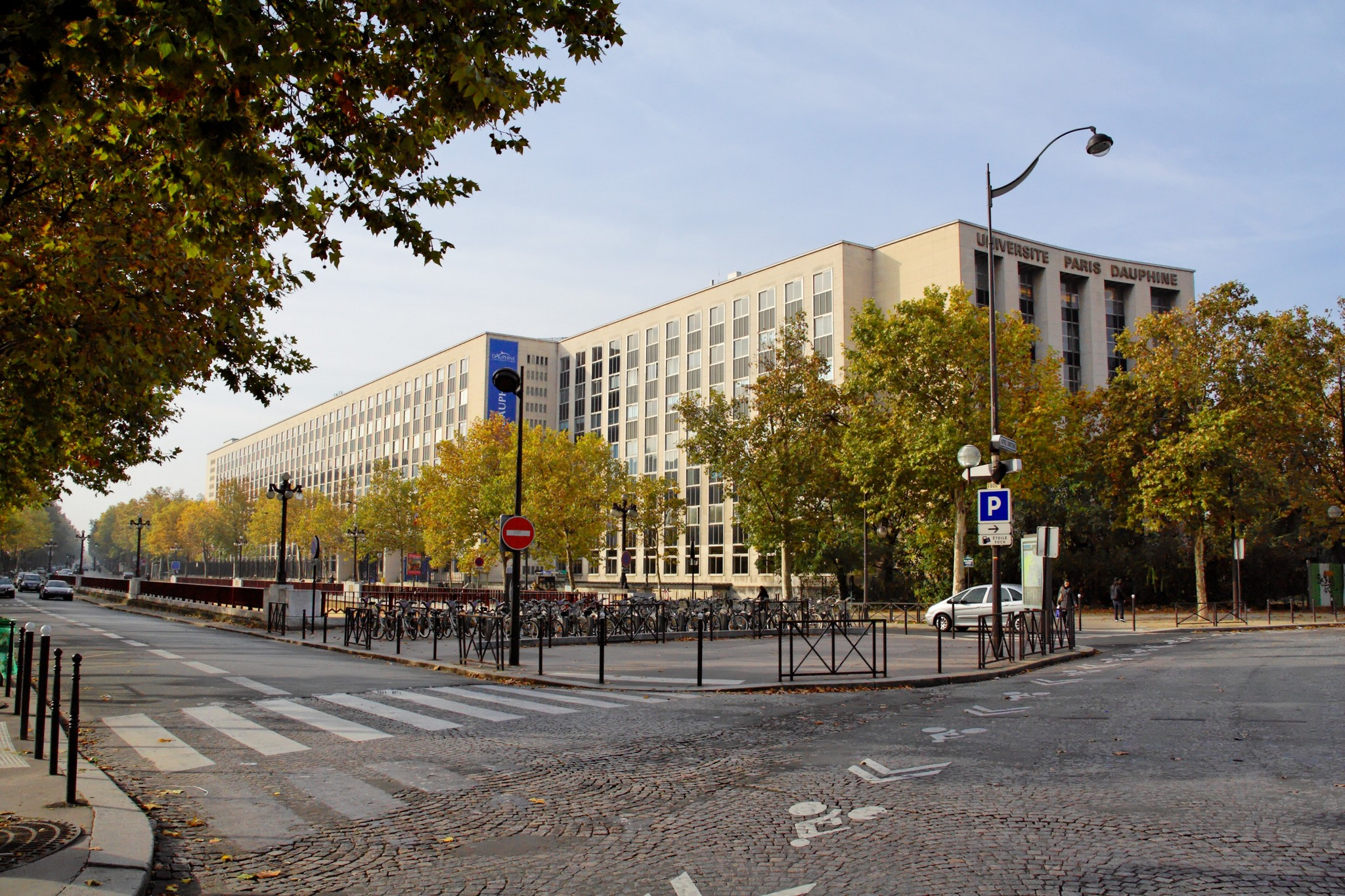
Dauphine, college of PSL University

=== Development ===
Between 2011 and 2012, ten new institutions joined the foundation: Conservatoire national supérieur d'Art dramatique, Conservatoire national supérieur de Musique et de Danse de Paris, École nationale supérieure des Arts décoratifs, École nationale supérieure des Beaux-Arts, La Fémis, Pierre-Gilles de Gennes Foundation for Research, Institut Curie, Institut Louis-Bachelier, MINES ParisTech and Université Paris Dauphine.

Their arrival reinforced PSL's scientific potential in the fields of engineering, biology, the arts, and management. In 2014, another four institutions specializing in humanities and social science joined the association: École française d'Extrême-Orient, École des hautes études en sciences sociales (EHESS), École nationale des Chartes, and École pratique des hautes études (EPHE).
In 2015, PSL organized itself into a university community (ComUE: PSL Research University). PSL began awarding PhDs at that point.

=== "Investing for the Future" program ===
In 2010, the French government launched a call for proposals to boost higher education: the Investing for the Future program (also called the grand emprunt). PSL has successfully responded to several calls for proposals. In 2011, with the Initiatives for Excellence call for proposals, PSL was one of the first three projects selected, along with University of Bordeaux and University of Strasbourg.

While the diversity of project participants has sometimes been cited as a weakness, the promoters of PSL underline the complementarity of its institutions and the potential for collaboration. The funding of the Excellence Initiative has, in addition, supported the creation of 11 Laboratories of excellence (Labex) within PSL: CelTisPhyBio, DCBIOL, DEEP, DYNAMO, ENS-ICFP, ESEP, IEC, IPGG, MemoLife, TransferS, and WIFI. In 2014, the Corail, HaStec, and TEPSIS Labex laboratories joined the list with EHESS and EPHE becoming members of PSL. Also in 2011, PSL's institutions presented ten projects under the "Equipped with excellence" (Equipex) program. Among the initial submissions, they obtained eight Equipex facilities: BEDOFIH, D-FIH, Equip@Meso, ICGex, IPGG, Paris-en-Resonnance, Planaqua, Ultrabrain. These projects have received funding ranging from 2 to 10 million euros.

In 2017, after a detailed review process, nine institutions agreed to put in place an integrated budget and a multi-year strategy for academic recruitment, as well as to create a number of shared platforms and services. Chimie ParisTech, École Nationale des Chartes, École Normale Supérieure, École Pratique des Hautes Etudes, ESPCI Paris, Institut Curie, Observatoire de Paris, MINES ParisTech, Paris-Dauphine University decided to jointly form PSL University. The agreement approved by their respective boards calls for the schools and institutions that form the university to adopt a unified strategy, to submit to the budgetary authority of the president of the university, to jointly plan their recruitment, and to transfer the whole of their diplomas to PSL. Towards the end of the process, in 2018, one of the former members, EHESS, did not approve the new statutes and decided not to be part of the target university.

Beaux-Arts de Paris, Collège de France, Conservatoire National Supérieur d'Art Dramatique, Conservatoire National Supérieur de Musique et de Danse de Paris, École Française d'Extrême-Orient, École Nationale Supérieure des Arts Décoratifs, La Fémis, Institut de Biologie Physico-Chimique and Institut Louis Bachelier are recognized as associates of the university pending later integration.

=== University status (2019) ===
In December 2018, an opportunity to formally create a full university arose with a new Ordonnance (ordinance) allowing to create a collegiate university, whose constituents may keep their legal personality, similar to British collegiate universities like Oxford and Cambridge.

In November 2019, a decree creating Université PSL as a collegiate university and the new statutes of the University were published. A few changes had occurred in the list of constituents, with nine institutions approving the new statutes and becoming établissement-composante (constituent colleges): Chimie ParisTech, Conservatoire national supérieur d'art dramatique, École Nationale des Chartes, École normale supérieure, École pratique des hautes études, ESPCI Paris, Observatoire de Paris, MINES ParisTech, Paris Dauphine. Additionally, College de France and Institut Curie became associate members, participating closely in the governance of the University. Associate members contribute to the strategy of the University, receive financial resources from PSL University and may carry scientific programs on behalf and by delegation thereof.

In January 2025, the École nationale supérieure d'architecture de Paris-Malaquais and École nationale supérieure des arts décoratifs joined PSL as constituent colleges.

== Organisation and administration ==
PSL is a collegiate university (17,000 students). It consists of 11 constituent schools, with plans to gradually expand to include some or all other associate colleges. Three national research organisations (CNRS, Inserm, Inria) are involved in governance and help to define PSL's strategy, with which they coordinate their own strategies.

=== Constituent colleges ===
Name	Foundation	Type	Field	Joined PSL	Students	Campus
École nationale supérieure de chimie	1896	Grande école	Engineering	2010 (founding member)	300	Paris
Conservatoire national supérieur d'art dramatique	1784	Grande école	Drama	2012 (founding member)	100	Paris
École nationale supérieure des arts décoratifs	1766	Grande école	Art and design	2025	700	Paris
École nationale supérieure d'architecture de Paris-Malaquais	2001	Public school of architecture (EPA)	Architecture	2025	1003	Paris
École normale supérieure	1794	École normale supérieure (special Grand établissement status)	Science and Human science	2010 (founding member)	2,400	Paris
École pratique des hautes études	1868	Grand établissement	Earth and Life Sciences, Historical and Philological Sciences, and Religious Sciences	2014 (founding member)	2,000	Paris, Condorcet
École supérieure de physique et de chimie industrielles	1882	Grande école	Engineering	2010 (founding member)	360	Paris
École nationale des chartes	1821	Grande école	Historical science	2014 (founding member)	170	Paris, Condorcet
École nationale supérieure des mines	1783	Grande école	Engineering	2012 (founding member)	1500	Paris
Observatoire de Paris	1667	Grand établissement	Science, Astrophysics	2010 (founding member)	150	Paris, Meudon, Nançay
Paris Dauphine University	c. 1150 (University of Paris), 1968	Grande école, grand établissement	Mathematics, Computer Science, Management, Economics, Finance, Law, Political Science, Journalism	2011	10,000	Paris
Collège de France	1530	Grand établissement	Sciences, Arts and Letters	2010 (founding member)		Latin Quarter
Curie Institute	1920	Governmental organisation	Science, Medicine	2011		

=== Associate colleges ===
Name	Foundation	Type	Field	Students	Campus
École nationale supérieure des Beaux-Arts	1817	Grande école	Arts	530	Paris
École française d'Extrême-Orient (EFEO)	1900	Research institute	Culture		Paris
Institut national du service public (INSP)	2022	Grande école	Public Administration	533	Strasbourg
École nationale supérieure des métiers de l'Image et du Son (La Fémis)	1943	Grande école	Film and television	230	Paris
Lycée Henri-IV	1796	Secondary school		1,948	Paris
Institut Louis Bachelier	2008	Organization	Economics and science		Paris

=== Presidents ===
The current president is Alain Fuchs. He took over the position from Thierry Coulhon in 2017, when Coulhon was appointed advisor to the French President in charge of Education, Higher Education, and Research.

- 2012–2014: Monique Canto-Sperber, previously director of ENS, founder and first president of PSL
- September 2014 – February 2015 (acting) Romain Soubeyran, director of MINES ParisTech
- 2014–2017: Thierry Coulhon, previously director of the Mathematical Sciences Institute at Australian National University in Canberra
- June – October 2017 (acting) Marc Mézard, director of ENS
- 2017 – 2024: Alain Fuchs, previously president of CNRS
- 2024 – present: El Mouhoub Mouhoud, previously president of Paris Dauphine University

=== Organization ===
PSL is administered by a Board of Directors chaired by the PSL president. It relies on the recommendations of an Academic Council and a Strategic Steering Committee. The executive organ of the university is the Executive Committee (the president, vice-presidents, and deans), supported by the Council of Members.

== Programs ==
PSL offers education from undergraduate to doctoral level, across all academic disciplines, including life sciences, physical sciences, humanities and social sciences, creative arts, economics, administration and management.

All of PSL's institutions have adopted a model of education through research.

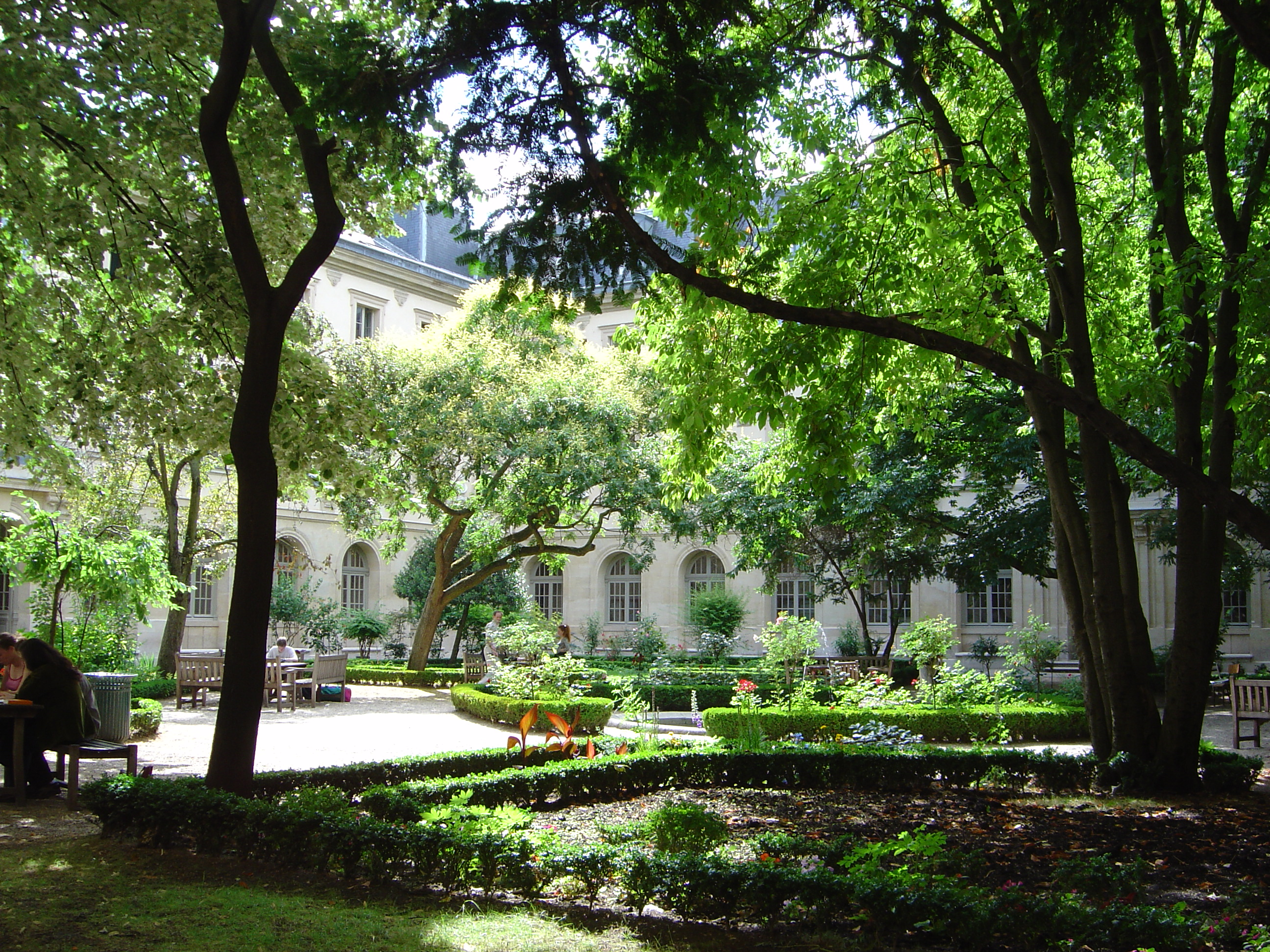
École normale supérieure, PSL University

=== Undergraduate programs ===
PSL and the Lycée Henri IV, along with Mines ParisTech, ESPCI Paris, Paris Dauphine University, Paris Observatory, École normale supérieure and Lycée Louis-le-Grand have implemented a three-year undergraduate program, the CPES multidisciplinary undergraduate course.

At Université Paris-Dauphine, a constituent of Université PSL, bachelor's degrees are available for students in the following fields: management, economics and finance, accounting, applied mathematics, computing, journalism (IPJ-Dauphine).

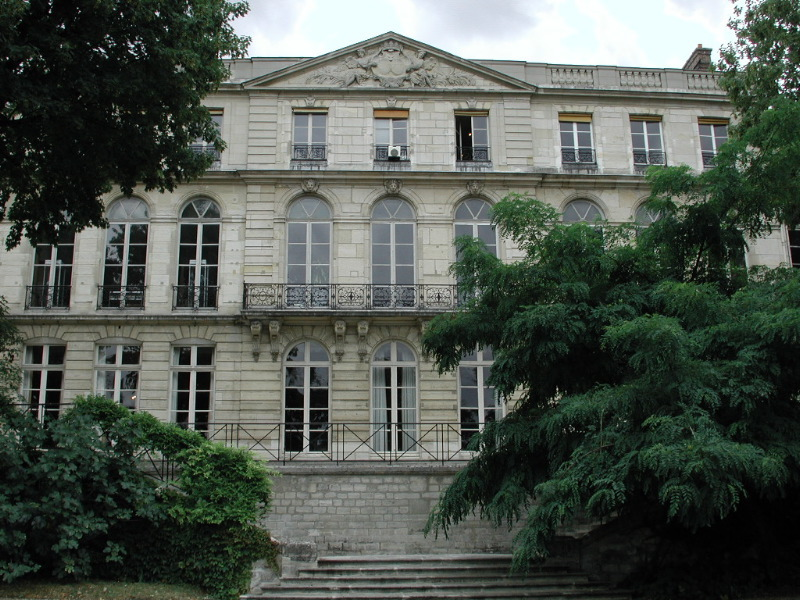
Mines ParisTech, PSL University

=== Sustainable Development Goals ===
PSL is co-leader of the SDSN Network for France, under the initiative of the United Nations., together with Kedge Business School and Universite Cergy-Pontoise. In this context, Université PSL is promoting that all students shall have access to courses related to climate, biodiversity and sustainability.

PSL has launched in 2020 a bachelor program dedicated to sustainability sciences.

PSL organizes a yearly summer school open to European students, to help understand the challenges of sustainable development: the European School of Positive Impact and Responsibility (ESPOIR).

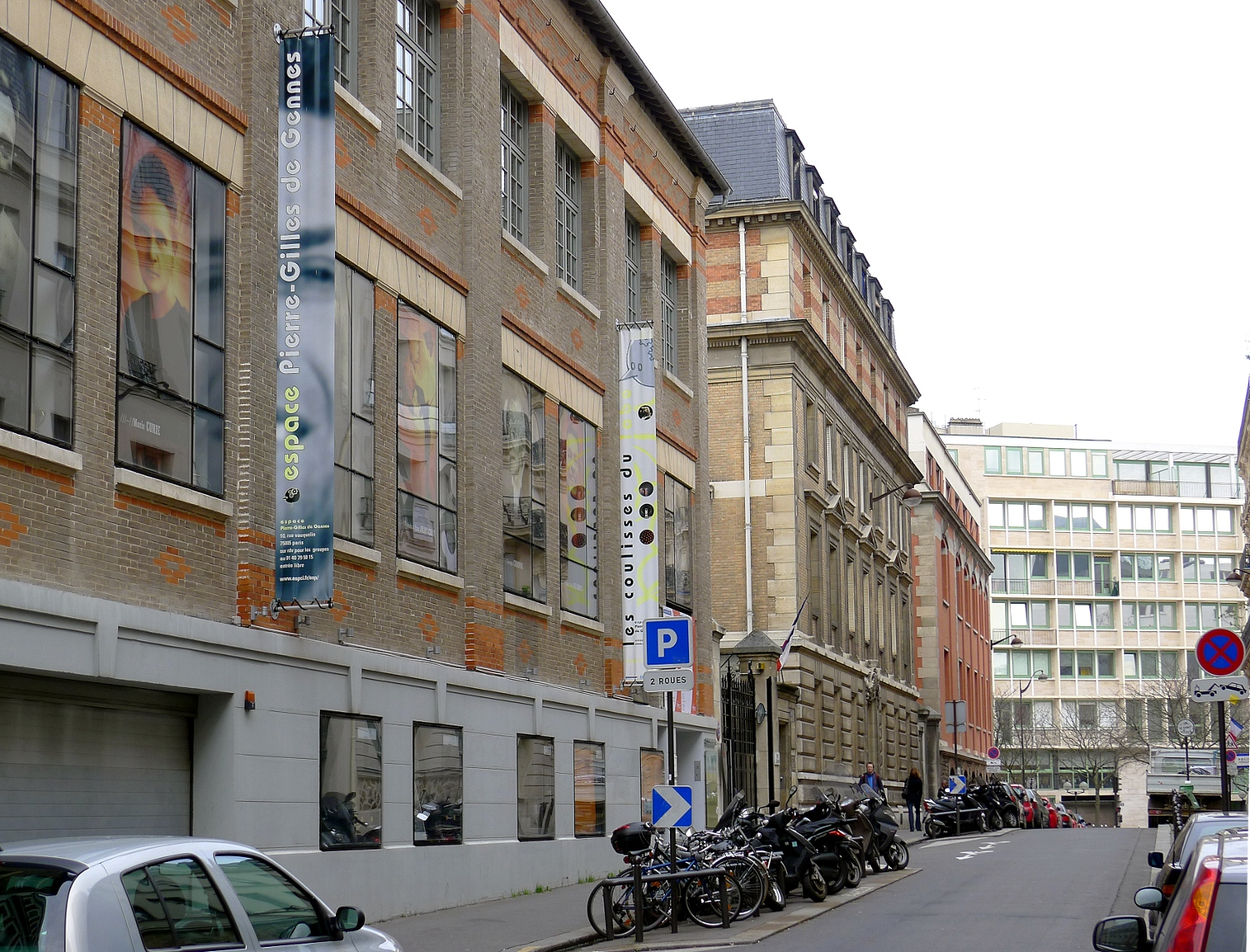
ESPCI Paris, PSL University

=== Graduate education ===
Université PSL offers training programs for graduate students through its constituent schools in a broad array of disciplines: engineering, fine and applied arts, management, economics, biology, humanities and social sciences, astronomy.

The first post-graduate/Master programme to be created under the umbrella of PSL between l'Université Paris-Dauphine and the Ecole normale supérieure, was the specialization Peace Studies launched in 2014 within the Master of International affairs and development.

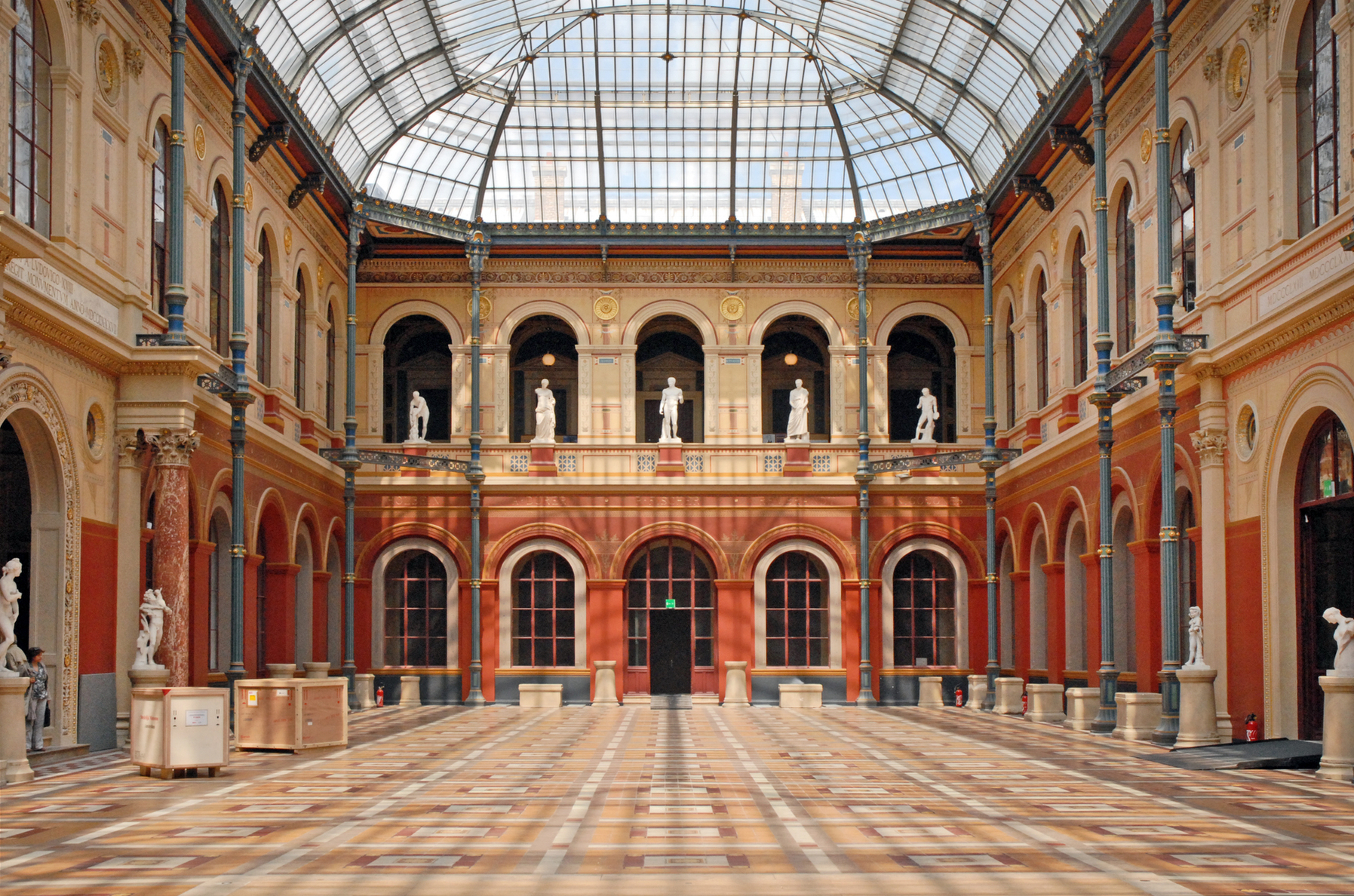
École nationale supérieure des Beaux-Arts, PSL University

=== Doctoral programs ===
More than 70% of PSL students are at the Master's or PhD level. University PSL Graduate Programs are inspired by the graduate schools that can be found in most of the world's research universities. The first two programs of this kind are a Graduate program in the Humanities (Translitterae) and a PhD program in Cognitive science (FrontCog).

==== SACRe Doctoral program ====
The "Science Art Creation Research" (SACRe) doctoral program aims at developing new fields of research by exploring the interfaces between the arts, and between arts and science (hard sciences as well as the humanities and social sciences). The program implements a new kind of PhD in Art strongly articulating practice and theoretical thinking. It brings together, along with the Ecole normale supérieure, five French schools of creative and performing arts: CNSAD (French professional acting school), Conservatoire national supérieur de musique et de danse de Paris (dance, music and sound design), École nationale supérieure des arts décoratifs, École nationale supérieure des Beaux-Arts and La Fémis.

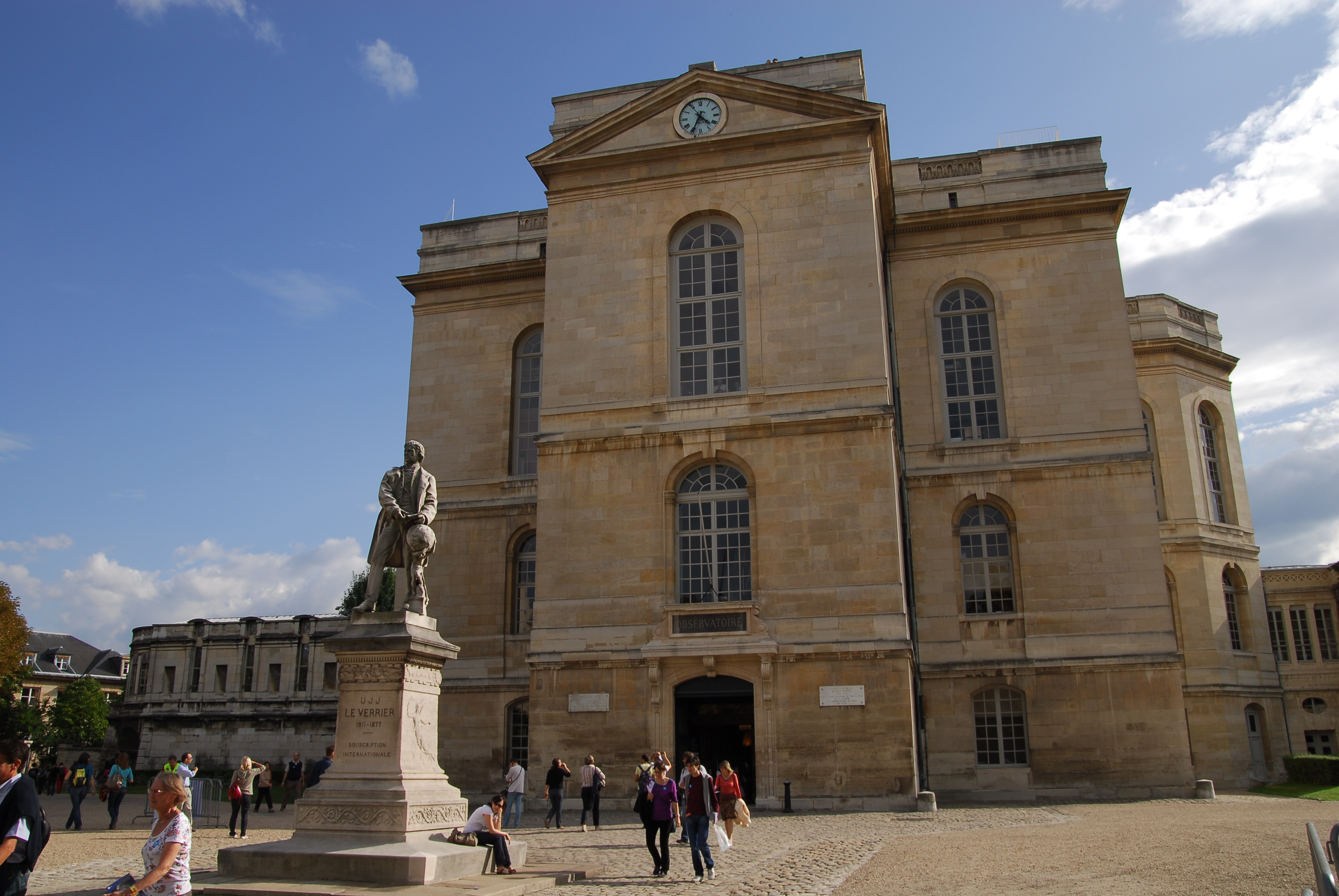
Observatoire de Paris, PSL University

== Research ==
PSL hosts some 140 laboratories, 2,900 research and teaching staff, and about 100 ERC grants. The scientific research strategy is organised around a core of discipline-specific programs and interdisciplinary programs such as the laboratories of excellence (Labex) (fr) and the Interdisciplinary and Strategic Research Initiatives. Examples of interdisciplinary programs are Scripta (History and practices of writing), the OCAV program (Origins and Conditions for the Emergence of Life), or the Q-Life Institute.

PSL's research landscape includes the following research fields: law, economics, and business administration; literature, literary theory, and philosophy; aesthetics and art theory; life and health sciences; area studies; energy and engineering; physics; chemistry; history; anthropology; informatics and data science; mathematics; materials science and soft matter science; cognitive science; sociology; earth and space science; religious studies; archaeology and heritage science.

== International rankings ==
University rankings

Global – Overall
- ARWU World: 40 (2022)
- CWUR World: 19 (2024)
- QS World: 24 (2025)
- QS Under 50: 5 (2021)
- THE World: 40 (2024)
- THE Young Universities: 2 (2024)

National – Overall
- ARWU National: 2 (2023)
- CWUR National: 1 (2024)
- QS National: 1 (2025)
- THE National: 1 (2024)

The first recognition of PSL's existence as an integrated university came in 2017, when it appeared on the Times Higher Education ranking in 72nd place globally and 1st place in France, and 41st place globally in 2018.

In 2020, PSL University appears for the first time in two other major university rankings: CWTS Leiden Ranking and ARWU: in the Shanghai ranking it is ranked 36th and 2nd French University behind Paris-Saclay University. In ARWU Global Ranking of Academic Subjects (also known as Shanghai Ranking by Subjects) University PSL is ranked among the best world universities in 39 of the 54 subjects, e.g., 10th in the world for Mathematics and for Physics, and 12th in Ecology.

In 2022, Université PSL is ranked first in the Young University Rankings 2022.

== Partnerships ==
International in scope, PSL has cultivated framework agreements with the University of Cambridge, UCL, EPFL, Columbia, Berkeley, NYU, Technion, ANU, Peking University, Shanghai Jiao Tong, National Taiwan University, Tsinghua University, and Hong Kong University of Science and Technology.

== PSL Symphonic Orchestra and Choir ==
The PSL Orchestra and Choir is a choral symphonic ensemble open to all members of the Université PSL community. PSL Orchestra and Choir's musical season consists of five different programs and incorporates contemporary work from different countries.

== Nobel and Fields laureates ==
- Serge Haroche – B.A and Professor – Nobel in Physics – 2012
- Albert Fert – B.A – Nobel in Physics – 2007
- Claude Cohen-Tannoudji – B.A and Professor – Nobel in Physics – 1997
- Georges Charpak – B.A and Professor – Nobel in Physics – 1992
- Pierre-Gilles de Gennes – B.A and Professor – Nobel in Physics – 1991
- Louis Néel – B.A – Nobel in Physics – 1970
- Alfred Kastler – B.A – Nobel in Physics – 1966
- Jean Perrin – B.A – Nobel in Physics – 1926
- Gabriel Lippmann – B.A – Nobel in Physics – 1908
- Marie Curie – PhD – Nobel in Physics – 1903
- Pierre Curie – PhD – Nobel in Physics – 1903
- Jean-Marie Lehn – Professor – Nobel in Chemistry – 1987
- Frédéric Joliot-Curie – B.A and Professor – Nobel in Chemistry – 1935
- Irène Joliot-Curie – Professor – Nobel in Chemistry – 1935
- Paul Sabatier – B.A and PhD – Nobel in Chemistry – 1912
- Marie Curie – PhD – Nobel in Chemistry – 1911
- Henri Moissan – B.A – Nobel in Chemistry – 1906
- Jean Dausset – Professor – Nobel in Physiology and Medicine – 1980
- Jacques Monod – Professor – Nobel in Physiology and Medicine – 1965
- François Jacob – Professor – Nobel in Physiology and Medicine – 1965
- Charles Nicolle – Professor – Nobel in Physiology and Medicine – 1928
- Jean-Paul Sartre – B.A – Nobel in Literature – 1964
- Roger Martin du Gard – B.A – Nobel in Literature – 1937
- Henri Bergson – B.A and Professor – Nobel in Literature – 1927
- Romain Rolland – B.A – Nobel in Literature – 1915
- Esther Duflo – B.A – Nobel in Economics – 2019
- Jean Tirole – PhD – Nobel in Economics – 2014
- Maurice Allais – Grad Attendee and Professor – Nobel in Economics – 1988
- Gérard Debreu – B.A – Nobel in Economics – 1983
- Cédric Villani – B.A, PhD and Professor – Fields Medal – 2010
- Ngô Bảo Châu – B.A – Fields Medal – 2010
- Wendelin Werner – B.A and Professor – Fields Medal – 2006
- Laurent Lafforgue – B.A – Fields Medal – 2002
- Jean-Christophe Yoccoz – B.A and Professor – Fields Medal – 1994
- Pierre-Louis Lions – B.A and Professor – Fields Medal – 1994
- Alain Connes – B.A and Professor – Fields Medal – 1982
- René Thom – B.A – Fields Medal – 1958
- Jean-Pierre Serre – B.A and Professor – Fields Medal – 1954
- Laurent-Moïse Schwartz – B.A – Fields Medal – 1950
- Hugo Duminil-Copin – B.A – Fields Medal – 2022

== Notable alumni ==
Business leaders

- Odile Hembise Fanton d’Andon, CEO of the ACRI-ST (since 2000)
- Emmanuel Roman, CEO of PIMCO
- Olivier François, President and CEO of Fiat
- Anne Rigail, CEO of Air France (since 2018)
- Patrick Pouyanné, CEO of TotalEnergies (since 2014)
- Jacques Aschenbroich, CEO of Valeo (since 2009)
- Jean-Laurent Bonnafé, CEO of BNP Paribas (since 2011)
- Tidjane Thiam, CEO of Credit Suisse (2015–2020)
- Carlos Ghosn, CEO of Nissan (2001–2018) and CEO of Renault-Nissan (2005–2018)
- Anne Lauvergeon, CEO of Areva (2001–2011)
- Thierry Desmarest, CEO of Total (1995–2010)
- Didier Lombard, CEO of France Télécom (2005–2010)
- Jean-Louis Beffa, CEO of Saint-Gobain (1986–2007)
- Jean-Martin Folz, CEO of PSA Peugeot Citroën (1995–2007)
- Denis Ranque, CEO of Thales Group (1998–2009)
- Noël Forgeard, former CEO of Airbus (1998–2005) and EADS (2005–2006)
- Francis Mer, CEO of Usinor (1986–2001) and former Minister of Finances of France (2002–2004)
- Thierry Bolloré, CEO of Jaguar Land Rover, former CEO of the Renault group
- Jacques Aigrain, Chairman & CEO of Swiss Re
- Michel Combes, CEO of Alcatel-Lucent, former CEO of TDF
- Christophe Chenut, CEO of Lacoste
- Thierry Morin, Chairman & CEO of Valeo
- François Pierson, Chairman of AXA France
- Bruno Bonnell, Chairman & founder of Infogrames, former CEO of Atari
- Régis Arnoux, CEO and founder of Catering International Services
- Diane Barrière-Desseigne, CEO of Groupe Lucien Barrière
- Jean-Michel Severino, CEO of the French Development Agency
- Florent Menegaux, Chairman & CEO of Michelin group
- Philippe Dupont, Chairman of BPCE
- Eugène Schueller, founder of L'Oréal
- Philippe Camus (1967), Chairman of Alcatel Lucent
- Isabelle Kocher (1987), CEO of Engie
- Jean-Charles Naouri (1967), CEO of Groupe Casino
- Georges Claude, founder of Air Liquide
- Régis Schultz, CEO of JD Sports
- Yannick Bolloré, CEO of Havas, chairman of the supervisory board of Vivendi, Vice Chairman of Bolloré group

Politicians

- Laurent Fabius (1966), Prime Minister of France, 1984–1986
- Édouard Herriot (1891), Prime Minister of France, 1924–1925, 1926 and 1932
- Jean Jaurès (1878), Socialist leader
- Alain Juppé (1964), Prime Minister of France 1995–1997
- Bruno Le Maire (1989), Minister of the Economy, 2017–present; Minister of Agriculture 2009–2012
- Benny Lévy (1965), founder of Gauche prolétarienne
- Paul Painlevé (1883), mathematician; Prime Minister of France in 1917 and 1925
- Georges Pompidou (1931), Prime Minister of France 1962–1968; President of France 1969–1974
- Alain Poher (1909–1996), politician, president of Sénat, president by interim of French Republic.
- Jean-Louis Bianco (1943–), General Secretary of President of France (1982–1991), Minister of Social Affairs (France) (1991–1992), Minister of Transport (France) (1992–1993), députy of Alpes de Haute Provence's 1st constituency (1997–)
- Charles de Freycinet, prime minister of France at the end of the 19th century
- Albert François Lebrun (1871–1950), president of France
- Najla Bouden Romdhane (1958–), prime minister of Tunisia (2021–)
- Boni Yayi, President of the Republic of Benin
- Raymond Ndong Sima, Prime Minister of Gabon
- Faure Gnassingbe, President of Togo
