= Jean-François Kahn =

French journalist and essayist (1938–2025)

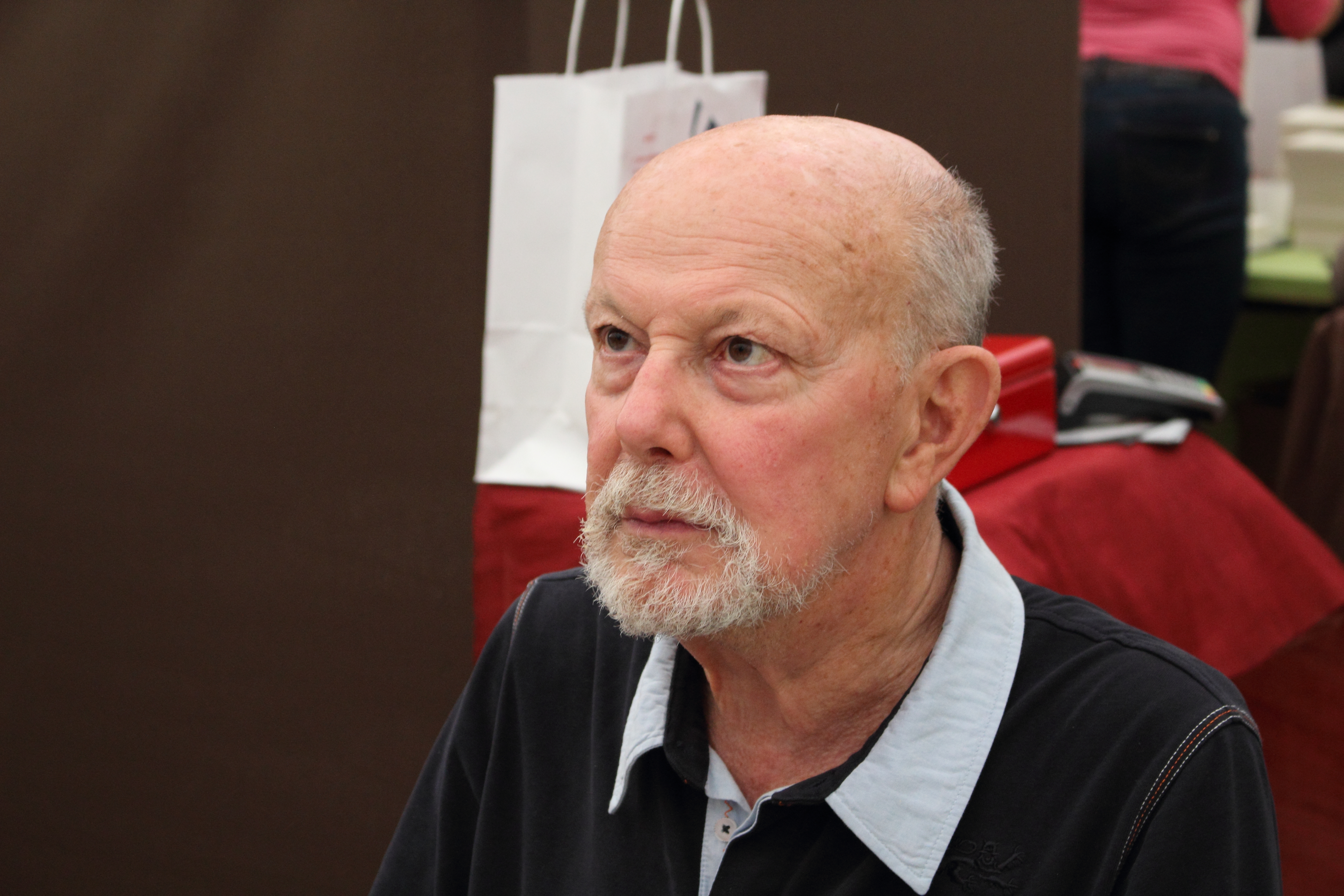
- Kahn in 2015
- Born: Jean-François Guy André Kahn; 12 June 1938; Viroflay, Seine-et-Oise, France
- Died: 22 January 2025 (aged 86); Avallon, Yonne, France
- Occupation: Journalist • Essayist
- Partner: Rachel Kahn
- Relatives: Axel Kahn, Olivier Kahn (brothers)

Jean-François Kahn (French pronunciation: [ʒɑ̃ fʁɑ̃swa kan]; 12 June 1938 – 22 January 2025) was a French journalist and essayist.

== Life and career ==
=== Family ===
Jean-François Kahn was born in the commune of Viroflay in Seine-et-Oise, a former department of France, on 12 June 1938 to Jewish father and a Catholic mother. Kahn had two brothers, geneticist Axel Kahn and chemist Olivier Kahn who were raised by his mother as opposed to him, who was raised by his father, after his parents separated in 1954. His father, Jean Kahn-Dessertenne, was of Alsatian Jewish origin, from a family from Bliesbruck who settled in Nancy after the Franco-Prussian War of 1870. His father served as a teacher at the Godéchoux private school at the time. His mother, Camille Ferriot (1914–2005) was daughter of a small wood industrialist and an antisemite teacher of Swiss German origins. His father died by suicide in 1970.

Having obtained a degree in history, he started work at a postal sorting office, then at a printing works. He soon moved into journalism and was sent to cover the war in Algeria, undertaking the journalistic investigation that became known as the 'Ben Barka affair'. Kahn then worked as a reporter for Paris-Press, L'Express and Europe 1. He later moved to Le Monde as special correspondent for North Africa. In 1977, he became editor of the compilation of the 'Nouvelles Littéraires' and in 1983, was named editor of Matin de Paris. In 1984, he created L'Événement du Jeudi then in 1997, together with Maurice Szafran, started the weekly magazine, Marianne, where he was the editor in chief until 2007. He often wrote under the pseudonym of François Darras or Serge Maury.

Kahn took a clear position on many media subjects, including:

- Denouncing economic liberalism in 1995.
- Denouncing the intervention of NATO in Serbia in 1999.
- Denouncing the American-led intervention in Iraq in 2003.
- He adopted a positive position on the European Constitution in 2005 but denounced the failure of the press to provide a proper platform for those who opposed it.
- In 2007, he actively supported UDF candidate François Bayrou for the presidency.
- In 2011, he dismissed the allegations of sexual assault against Dominique Strauss-Kahn as un troussage de domestique (literally, stripping or having casual, forced sex with a servant). He later apologised and resigned from journalism.

Kahn also introduced the concept of Pensée unique.

== Death ==
Kahn died on 22 January 2025, at the age 86 in Avallon. He was buried in the cemetery of Mussy-sur-Seine, Aube.

== Partial bibliography ==
- “God, How They Hated Him!”. Telos 44 (Summer 1980). New York: Telos Press.
- La guerre civile, Seuil, 1982
- Et si on essayait autre chose?, Seuil, 1983
- Les Français sont formidables, Balland, 1987
- Esquisse d'une philosophie du mensonge, Flammarion, 1992
- Tout change parce que rien ne change, Fayard, 1994
- On prend les mêmes et on recommence, Grasset et Fasquelle, 1997
- Les poèmes politiques, Fayard, 1998
- Tout était faux, Fayard, 1998
- Demain la révolution, Flammarion, 1999
- Chacun son tour, Stock, 2000
- Complot contre la Démocratie, Denoël, 2000
- La pensée unique, Fayard, 2000
- Le retour de terre de Djid Andrew; Critique de la raison capitaliste, Fayard, 2000
- Victor Hugo un révolutionnaire; L'extraordinaire Metamorphose, Fayard 2001
- Moi, l'Autre et le loup, Fayard, 2001
- Les Rebelles, ceux et celles qui ont dit non, Plon, 2001
- Ce que Marianne en pense, éditions des Mille et une nuits, 2002
- Le camp de la guerre, Critique de la déraison impure, Fayard, 2004
- Dictionnaire incorrect, Plon, 2005
- Comme deux frères – mémoire et visions croisées (avec Axel Kahn), Stock, 2006
- Les bullocrates, Fayard, 2006
