= Jacques Livage =

French chemist and academic (1938–2025)

- Born: Jacques Alain Yves Livage; 26 October 1938; Neuilly-sur-Seine, France
- Died: 9 November 2025 (aged 87); Orsay, France
- Education: École nationale supérieure de chimie de Paris
- Occupation: Chemist

Jacques Livage (26 October 1938 – 9 November 2025) was a French chemist, who held the chair of condensed matter chemistry at the Collège de France, and was a member of the French Academy of Sciences.

== Life and career ==
Livage was born in Neuilly-sur-Seine on 26 October 1938. In 1960, he obtained an Engineer's degree from the École nationale supérieure de chimie de Paris where he also obtained a doctorate. He was an assistant and then a master assistant at the same school from 1960 to 1973. He was a professor at the Pierre-et-Marie Curie University from 1973, and a professor at the Collège de France from 2001.

Livage died on 9 November 2025 in Orsay at the age of 87.

== Scientific work ==
Livage was a pioneer in the field of soft chemistry. In particular, he has developed sol-gel processes to obtain original materials that are inaccessible through the traditional channels of inorganic chemistry. His work aims in particular to copy biomineralisation processes, which are natural processes that make it possible to obtain glass-type materials under particularly mild conditions compared to conventional production processes. The industrial applications of such a chemistry are considerable.

He published more than 500 scientific articles.

== Awards and honours ==
- Yvan Peyches Prize from the French Academy of sciences in 1980
- Member of the International Academy of Ceramics in 1995
- Member of the Institut universitaire de France from 1996 to 2001
- Member of the French Academy of sciences since 1999
- Chevalier of the Légion d'honneur in 2003

== Books ==
- Theoretical chemistry: concepts and problems, Hermann, 1972
- Materials: present and future" Rhône Poulenc Recherches, 1990
- Les gels, Elsevier, 1995.
- De la solution à l'oxyde, EDP Sciences et Éditions du CNRS, 1998.
- Metal oxide chemistry and synthesis, J. Wiley, 2000.
- Chemistry of condensed matter, Fayard, 2003.
