= Le Petit-Pressigny =

- Commune
- Coat of arms
- Location of Le Petit-Pressigny
- Location within France Location within Centre-Val de Loire
- Coordinates: 46°55′22″N 0°55′12″E
- Country: France
- Region: Centre-Val de Loire
- Department: Indre-et-Loire
- Arrondissement: Loches
- Canton: Descartes
- Intercommunality: CC Loches Sud Touraine

Government
  - Mayor (2020–2026): Jean-François Cron
- Area^{1}: 32.05 km^{2} (12.37 sq mi)
- Highest elevation: 14 m (46 ft)
- Lowest elevation: 71 m (233 ft)
- Population (2023): 305
  - Density: 9.52/km^{2} (24.6/sq mi)
- Time zone: UTC+01:00 (CET)
  - Summer (DST): UTC+02:00 (CEST)
- INSEE/Postal code: 37184 /37350
- ^{1} French Land Register data, which excludes lakes, ponds, glaciers > 1 km^{2} (0.386 sq mi or 247 acres) and river estuaries.

Le Petit-Pressigny (French pronunciation: [lə pəti pʁesiɲi]) is a commune in the Indre-et-Loire department in central France.

== Population ==
Historical population
Year	Pop.	±% p.a.
1968	624	—
1975	532	−2.25%
1982	445	−2.52%
1990	394	−1.51%
1999	366	−0.82%
2007	320	−1.66%
2012	328	+0.50%
2017	336	+0.48%
2023	305	−1.60%
Source: INSEE

== Notable people ==
- Axel Kahn (1944–2021), geneticist, was born in Le Petit-Pressigny

== See also ==
- Communes of the Indre-et-Loire department
