= Patrick Tabeling =

French physicist

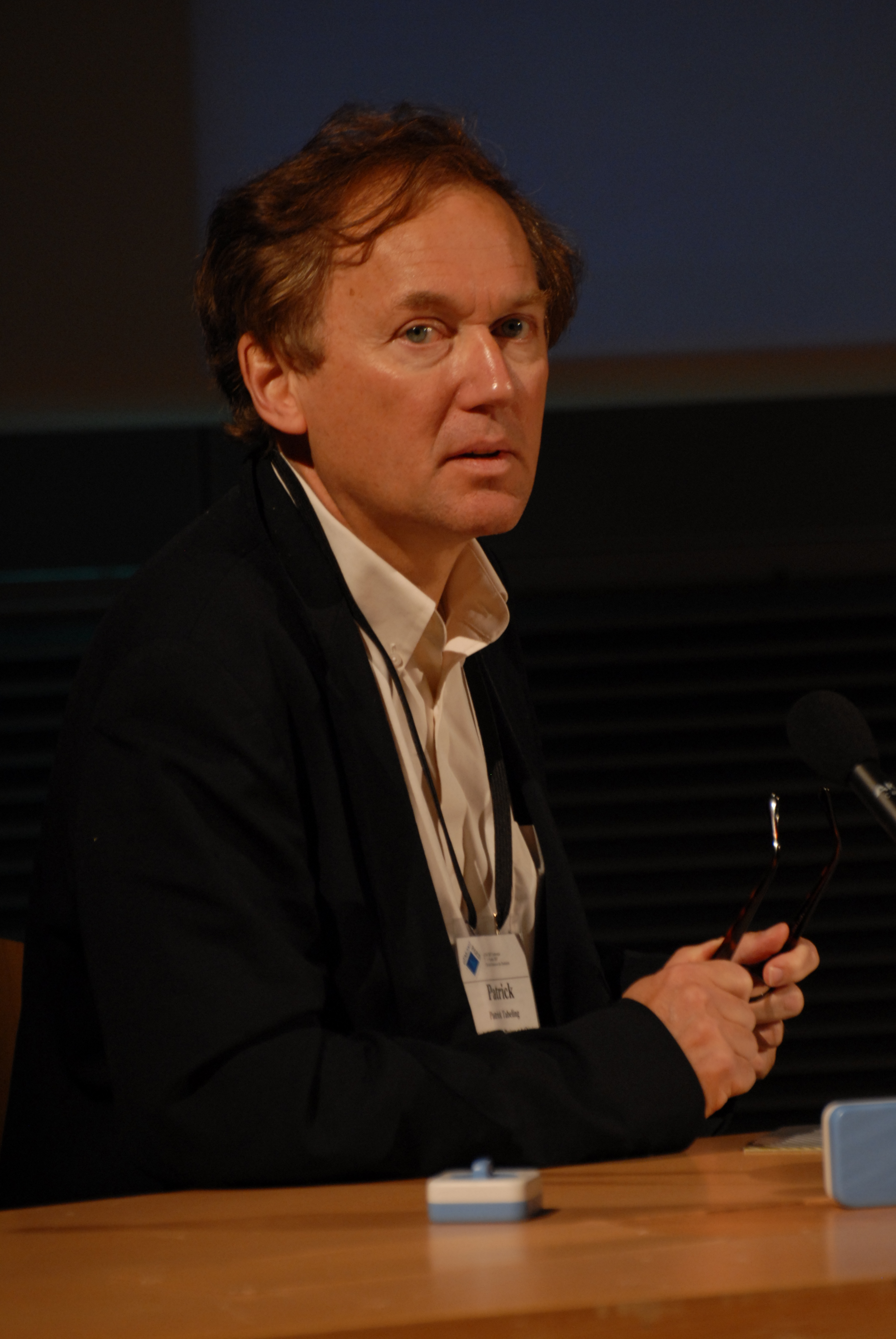
Patrick Tabeling, MicroTAS 2007.

Patrick Tabeling is a French physicist, microfluidics pioneer in France, researcher at the École supérieure de physique et de chimie industrielles de la ville de Paris (ESPCI ParisTech). He has published more than 200 articles in prestigious peer-reviewed journals and his work has been cited more than 14000 times. He has been the director of the Pierre Gilles de Gennes Institute for Microfluidics (IPGG), an interdisciplinary research institution in Paris which regroups more than 300 expert researchers.

== Biography ==
Graduated from the École supérieure d'électricité (1974 promotion), Patrick Tabeling was a CNRS (Centre National de la Recherche Scientifique) researcher at the statistical physics laboratory of the École normale supérieure de la rue d'Ulm (ENS Ulm) from 1985 to 2001. In 2001, he moved to the École supérieure de physique et de chimie industrielles de la ville de Paris (ESPCI ParisTech) where he created the group Microfluidics, Microelectromechanical systems (MEMS) and nanostructures laboratory. He was charged by the French National Centre for Scientific Research to coordinate the activity of research laboratories in microfluidics as a chairman of the French microfluidic network.

Patrick Tabeling has published "Introduction to Microfluidics" (Oxford University Press, 2005), was divisional editor of Physical Review Letters, associated Editor of "Physics of Fluids". He is cofounder of IPGG (Institut Pierre Gilles de Gennes) and acted as director (Institut Pierre-Gilles de Gennes) from 2011 to 2018. He published more than 200 papers, was elected to Academia Europaea (2010). He is the cofounder of MicroFactory (2014) and Minos Biosciences (2018).

== Works ==
Patrick Tabeling's laboratory develops microfluidic applications with industrial and research laboratories of biology and analytical Chemistry of ESPCI and is concerned with fundamental topics such as wall slippage, self organization, droplet dynamics or stem cells.

== Bibliography ==
- Patrick Tabeling, Introduction à la microfluidique (Introduction to Microfluidics), Belin, 2003.
