= Paris Universitas =

French alliance of six institutions of higher education

- Motto: י
- Type: Public
- Established: 2005 (University of Paris 1253)
- Endowment: 1,5 billion €
- President: Gilbert Béréziat
- Academic staff: 5,500
- Students: 70,000
- Undergraduates: 25,000
- Doctoral students: 8,000
- Location: Paris, France
- Campus: Multiple campuses

Paris Universitas was an alliance of six institutions of higher education in Paris, France, that existed from 2005 to 2010. Paris Universitas offered a wide range of disciplines, from medicine to the humanities, engineering, law, management and the social sciences. The institution expected to rank between 1 and 3 in Europe for number of publications, although rankings were not released due to the short lifespan of the institution. In 2006, Paris Universitas was ranked first among European universities and 4th in the world for the largest volume of English-language publications.

Paris Universitas had 350 research laboratories, a broad range of disciplines, and almost 80,000 students.

== Organisation ==
Paris Universitas was a collegiate university, with its main functions divided between the central departments of the university and the higher education institutions that are members. They are technically institutions independent of the university itself and enjoy considerable autonomy. Unlike the University of London or University of California, Paris Universitas did not have the power to award degrees.

=== Institutions ===
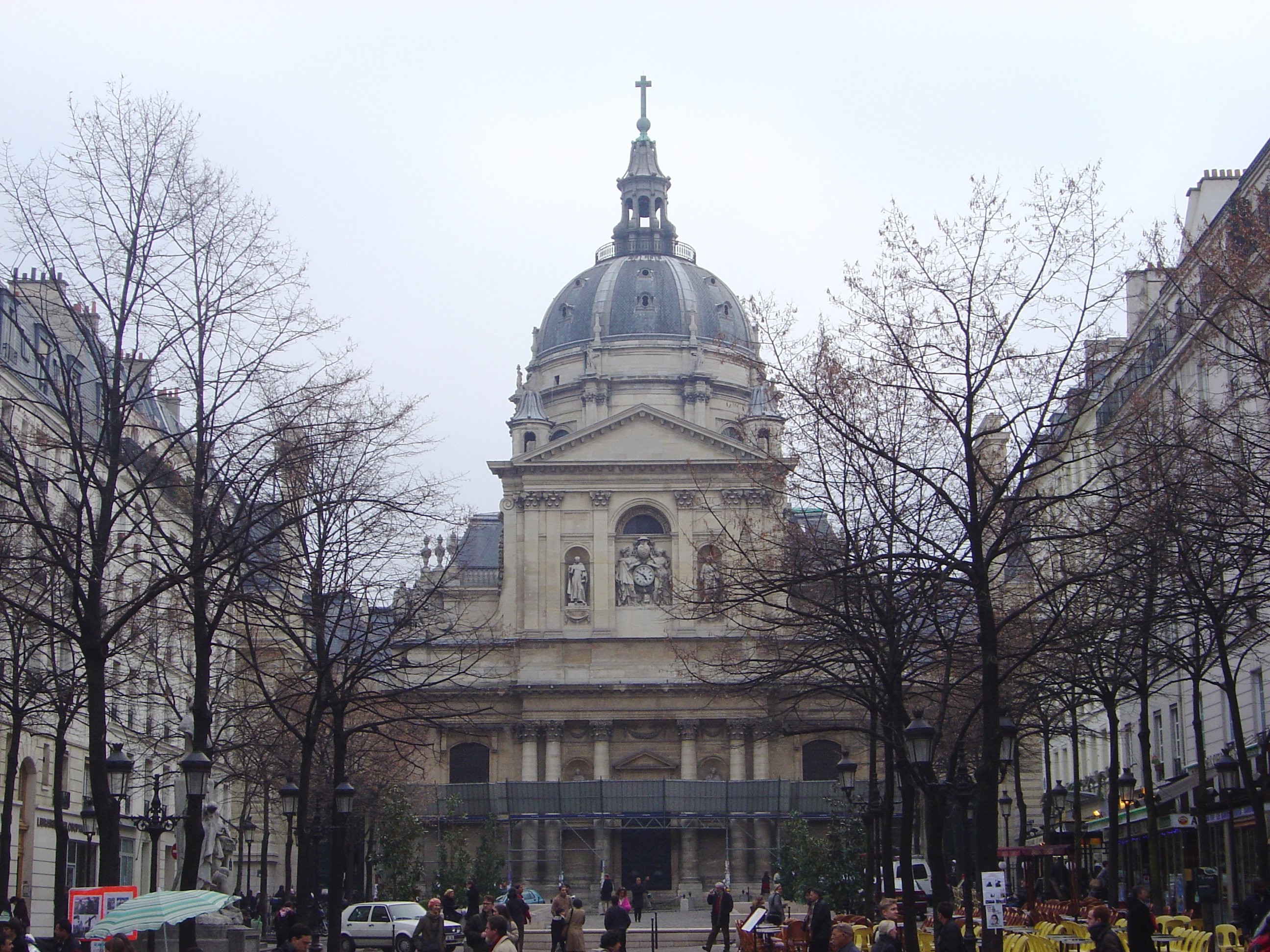
Central Sorbonne Building

Paris Universitas comprised eight institutions:

- École Normale Supérieure
- École des hautes études en sciences sociales
- Pantheon-Assas University
- Université Sorbonne nouvelle
- Paris-Sorbonne University (since April 2008)
- Pierre-and-Marie-Curie University
- Paris-Dauphine University
- École pratique des hautes études (since April 2008)

More institutions were expected to join Paris Universitas:

- Supélec École Supérieure d'Électricité
- ESPCI École Supérieure de Physique et de Chimie Industrielles de la Ville de Paris
- ENSCP École nationale supérieure de chimie de Paris
- Centrale Paris École centrale Paris
- INALCO Institut national des langues et civilisations orientales

If this process had reached to an end, Paris Universitas would have been one of the five French universities with around 100,000 students with Paris Centre Universités, the Université Lille Nord de France, the Université de Lyon, the University of Toulouse, and among the largest universities in Europe.

=== Research and teaching ===
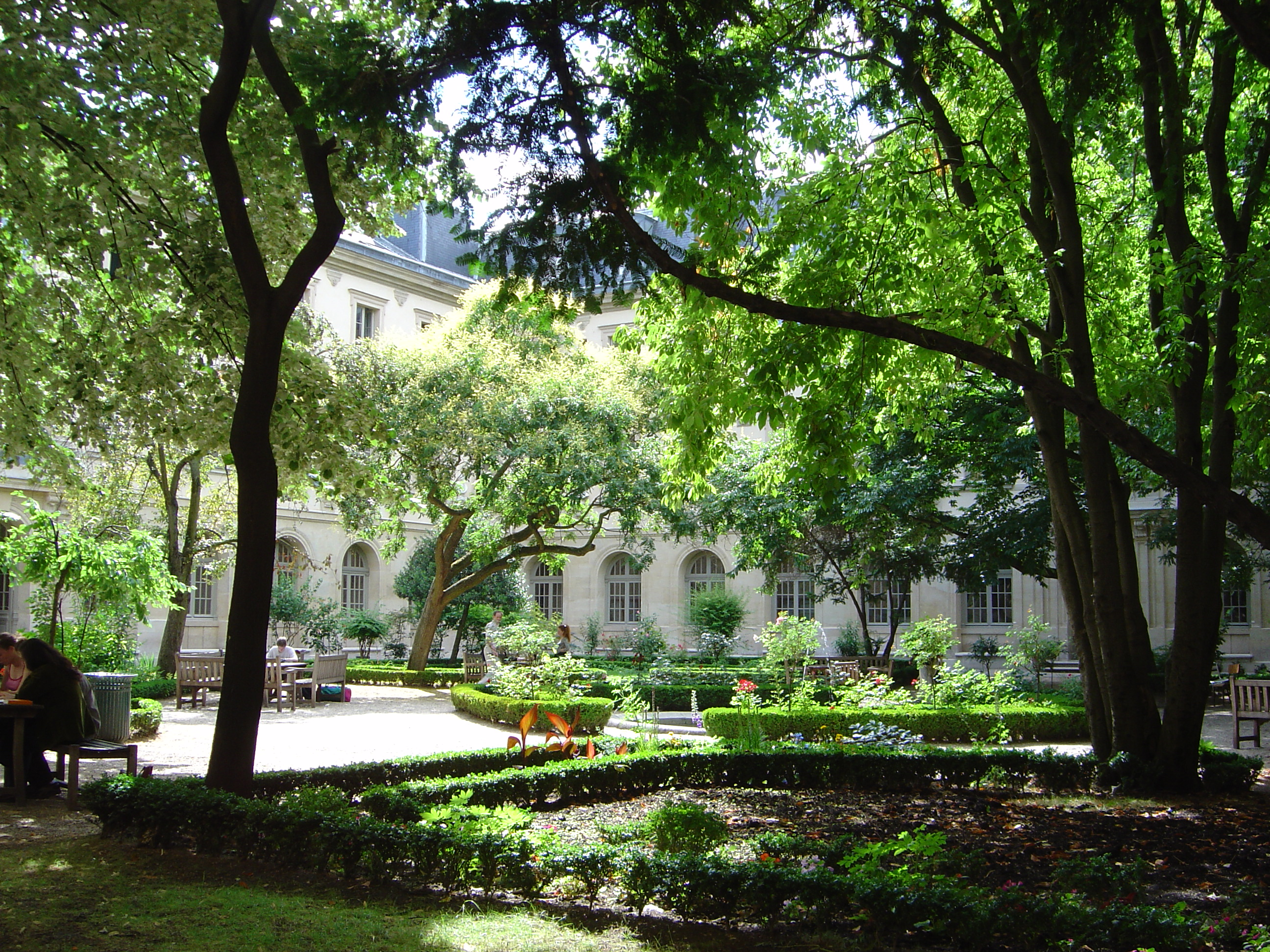
The quadrangle at the main ENS building on rue d'Ulm is known as the Cour aux Ernests – the Ernests being the goldfish in the pond.

Paris Universitas had research departments and teaching faculties in most academic disciplines.

==== Research ====
The constituent institutions of Paris Universitas conducted research in many areas within the basic sciences, humanities, economics, social sciences, and law. There were 182 CNRS/APU and 58 INSERN/APU member research units. There were also 40 common laboratories.

==== Programs ====
The Paris Universitas had a number of joint degrees at the baccalaureate, masters, and doctoral levels that involve participation and dual institutions within the alliance. There were also 17 international programs as follows:

Masters

- Brain and Mind (UPMC/ENS/UC London)
- French & Italian law (Panthéon-Assas/La Sapienza)
- French & German law (Panthéon-Assas/U Berlin/U Munich)
- European jurist & lawyer (Panthéon-Assas/King's College London/U Berlin)
- Computing science (UPMC/université de Montréal)
- French & Suisse law (Panthéon-Assas/ Fribourg)
- American law (Panthéon-Assas/Columbia U)
- English law (Panthéon-Assas/ Oxford or University College, London)
- Executive MBA (Dauphine/UQAM)
- Management of projects & NTIC (Dauphine/Georgia State University)
- Marine biology (UPMC/PUChili/U Barcelona)
- Electronics (UPMC/U Valencia/U Brescia)
- Nanosciences (UPMC/U Uppsala)
- Developmental biology (UPMC/U Lisbonne/ U Pompeu Fabra)
- Financing & control (Dauphine/U Sankt Peterburg)

Bachelors

- French & English law (Cambridge/Panthéon-Assas)
- French & Common law (Panthéon-Assas/University College Dublin)
- French & Spain law (Panthéon-Assas/Universidad Complutense de Madrid)

Proposed

- Master of Health Sciences (EHESS/UPMC/Dauphine/Panthéon Assas)
- Master of Sciences & decision (UPMC/EHESS)

== Statistics ==
As September 2007

- 70 000 students
- Bachelor studies : 25 000
- Masters studies : 20 000
- PhD studies : 8 000
- Medical studies : 5 000
- « Engineering Schools » : 4 500
- Other studies : 7 500
- Academic staff : 5 500
- Administrative and technical staff : 3 700
- Budget with salaries : 1 500 M €
- Research :
- Joint CNRS/APU’s member research units : 182
- Joint INSERM/APU’s member research units : 58
- Common labs inside Paris Universitas : 40
- 10 years citations : 569 644 ( 3rd in Europe)

== Reputation ==
- Université Paris Dauphine, the famous university of management in France
- École Normale Supérieure ranked 18th in the world, and 5th in Europe. in the 2006 THES - QS World University Rankings,
- Université Paris-Sorbonne ranked 1st in France and 29th in the world for Arts & Humanities in The Times Higher Education Supplement (THES) - QS World University Rankings 2007.
- Université Pierre-et-Marie-Curie ranked 39th in the World and 1st in France for the Sciences & Mathematics by the Academic Ranking of World Universities.
- Panthéon-Assas University ranks first in France in most legal subjects.

== Campus abroad ==
The ENS group opened a branch at the East China Normal University in Shanghai, China.

The Paris-Sorbonne university and the United Arab Emirates signed a cooperation agreement for the creation of the new Paris-Sorbonne University Abu Dhabi.

== History ==
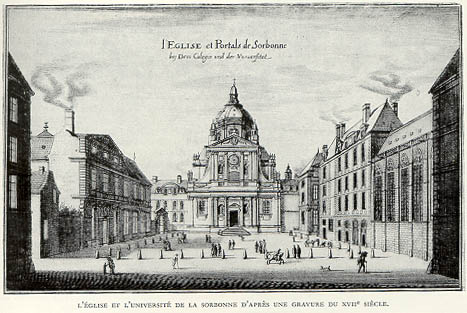
The Sorbonne, Paris, in a 17th-century engraving

The historic University of Paris (French: Université de Paris), second oldest university in continuous operation, appeared in the second half of the 12th century and grew up around the Notre Dame Cathedral. The medieval Latin term universitas actually had the more general meaning of a guild, and the university of Paris was known as a universitas magistrorum et scholarium (a guild of masters and scholars). The university had four Faculties: Arts, Medicine, Law, and Theology.

The ancient university disappeared with ancient France under the Revolution. All the French universities were replaced by a single centre, the University of France. After a century (in 1896), people recognized that the new system was less favourable to study and restored the old system, but without the faculty of theology.

Following the cultural revolution commonly known as "the French May", resulting in the closing of the university for only the third time in history, the university was in 1970 reorganised as 13 autonomous universities. Most of these universities have joined, or are in the process of forming (March 2008), new groupings along the lines of a collegiate university. Typically, these groupings take the legal form of a Center for Research and Higher Education (Pôle de Recherche et d'Enseignement Supérieur, or PRES), though some have opted for other forms of organization. Paris Universitas was one of the two new large university centers in the city of Paris, along with Paris Centre Universités.
