= Maison des Sciences de L'Homme =

Research foundation based in Paris, France

- Maison des Sciences de L'Homme
- Nickname: MSH
- Founded at: Paris, France
- Type: Non-profit research foundation
- Legal status: Public utility
- Location: Paris, France
- Website: www.fmsh.fr/en

Maison des Sciences de l'Homme also known as MSH a is a research foundation based in Paris, France. MSH provides a platform for national and international collaboration between various institutions, fields and researchers. It was established on 4 January 1963. The work of MSH includes regrouping various research and work tools under the same building to conduct new research through the process of experimentation. MSH re-collects, publicize and distributes the scientific data.
