= Chimie ParisTech =

Engineering school in Paris, part of PSL University

Chimie ParisTech - PSL
- École nationale supérieure de chimie de Paris
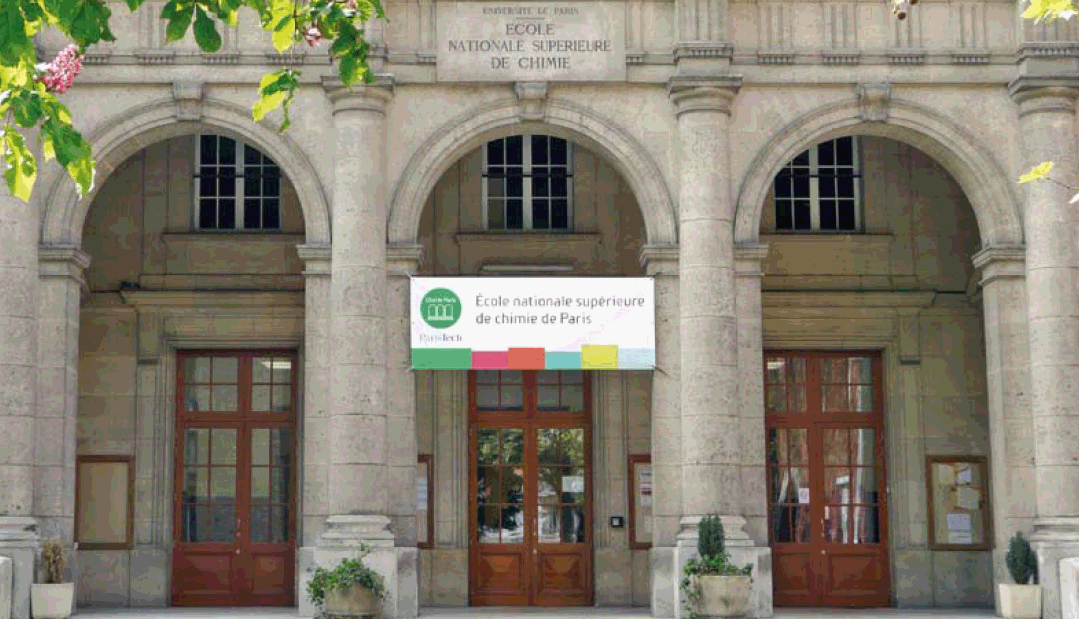
- Type: Grandes Écoles
- Established: 1896
- Affiliations: ParisTech (Paris Institute of Technology), IDEA League, Université PSL
- Director: Christian Lerminiaux
- Location: Paris, France; 48°50′38″N 2°20′37″E
- Campus: 5th arrondissement of Paris
- Website: www.chimieparistech.psl.eu/en

Chimie ParisTech, officially École nationale supérieure de chimie de Paris (French pronunciation: [ekɔl nɑsjɔnal sypeʁjœʁ də ʃimi də paʁi]; "National High School of Chemistry of Paris") and also known as ENSCP or Chimie Paris, is a grande école and a constituent college of PSL Research University specialised in chemical science. It was founded in 1896 within the University of Paris and is located in the 5th arrondissement of Paris.

Most of the students enter the school after highly competitive exams known as the Concours commun Mines-Ponts, following at least two years of classes préparatoires. There is also a small number of high-achieving students from French universities admitted to the school. Chimie ParisTech is widely known as France's most selective chemical engineering college

The school is a research center hosting ten laboratories which conduct high level research in various fields of chemistry.

== History ==
The École nationale supérieure de chimie de Paris was founded in 1896 by Charles Friedel, a chemist and mineralogist who headed the school until 1899. At the time, the school was called the Laboratoire de chimie pratique et industrielle. It was located in the 6th arrondissement (rue Michelet), where it stayed until 1923.

After the death of Friedel, Henri Moissan took the reins of the school. He was awarded the Nobel Prize for chemistry in 1906, while he was director. Moissan made student admission subject to competitive exams and renamed the school Institut de chimie appliquée (Institute of Applied Chemistry).

In 1907, the school began delivering a prestigious masters of engineering. In the same year, Moissan died and a transitional directorate was created. Soon thereafter, Camille Chabrié was named director. The school closed when World War I started and reopened in 1916. This was also the first year a female student was admitted; the ENSCP was one of the first engineering schools in France to do so.

In 1923, the school moved to its current location, on the rue Pierre et Marie Curie (in the 5th arrondissement). The buildings were designed and built by Henri-Paul Nénot, architect of the Sorbonne. In 1932, the school became l'Institut de Chimie de Paris (Paris Institute of Chemistry). Finally, in 1948, it became the École nationale supérieure de chimie de Paris (ENSCP).

== ENSCP directors ==
- 1896 - 1899 : Charles Friedel
- 1899 - 1907 : Henri Moissan (Nobel Prize in Chemistry)
- 1907 - 1908 : collective direction
- 1908 - 1928 : Camille Chabrié
- 1928 - 1938 : Georges Urbain (member of the French Academy of Sciences)
- 1938 - 1950 : Louis Hackspill
- 1950 - 1961 : Georges Chaudron (member of the French Academy of Sciences)
- 1961 - 1976 : Jacques Bénard
- 1976 - 1985 : Fernand Coussemant
- 1985 - 1987 : Jean Talbot
- 1987 - 1992 : Claude Quivoron
- 1992 - 1996 : Bernard Trémillon
- 1996 - 2005 : Danièle Olivier
- 2006 - 2010 : Alain Fuchs
- 2010 - 2015 : Valérie Cabuil
- 2015–present : Christian Lerminiaux

== Research units ==
Notable research units includes:

- Photovoltaic Energy Development and Research Institute, École nationale supérieure de chimie de Paris in association with the CNRS. Director Olivier Kerrec and research director Daniel Lincot.

== Notable alumni ==
- Pedro Nel Ospina, former President of Colombia
- Alain Berton, chemical engineer
- Eugène Schueller, founder of L'Oréal
- Jacques Bergier, chemical engineer
- Olivier Kahn, French chemist
- Jacques Livage, French chemist
- Ethel Moustacchi Egyptian-born French chemist and geneticist
- Raphaël Quenard, French actor
- Henri B. Kagan, French chemist, Nobel Prize in Chemistry
- André Couder, optician and astronomer
