= Menez =

Menez or Ménez is a surname, and may refer to:

Menez means mount or mountain in Breton.

- Maria Inês Ribeiro da Fonseca a.k.a. Menez - Portuguese painter
- Jérémy Ménez - French international footballer
- André Menez - French biologist
- Bénédicte Menez - French geomicrobiologist
- Bernard Menez - French actor
- Conner Menez - American baseball player
- François Ménez - French writer and journalist
- Bruno Menais a.k.a. Yann Menez - French writer
- Yves Ménez a.k.a. Pier Min (1905 – 1983) - Breton accordionist
