= André Menez =

French biologist

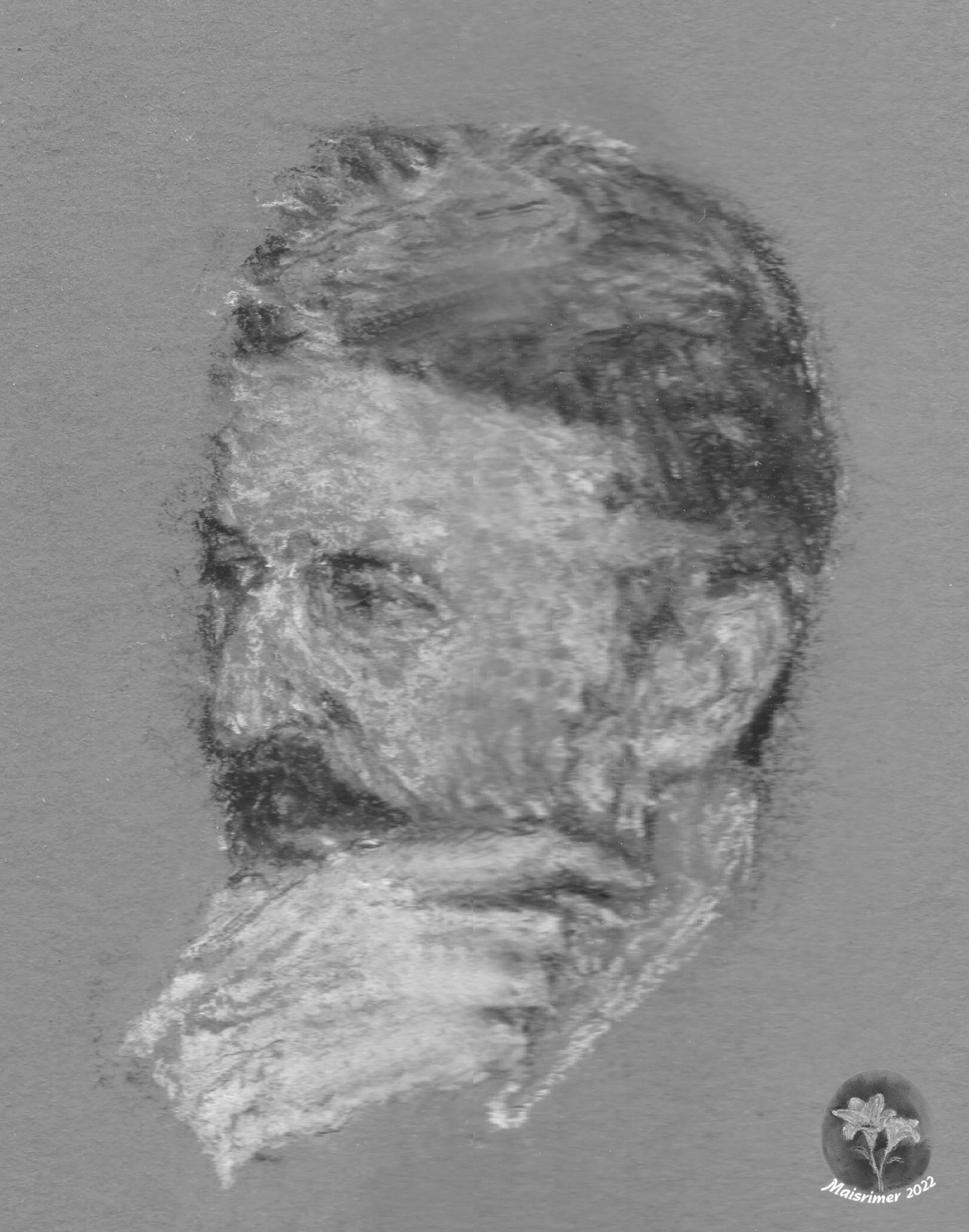
Pr. André Menez

André Menez (September 12, 1943, in Vire – February 2, 2008, in Versailles) was a French biologist, who served as president of the National Museum of Natural History, France from 2006 to 2008. As a biologist, he specialised in the toxicology of snakes, scorpions, and sea anemones. He was knighted with the Legion of Honour, and the National Ordre du Merit.

== Biography ==
With a PhD in biology from Paris Diderot University, André Menez joined the French Alternative Energies and Atomic Energy Commission in 1968 as a research engineer in the Biology Department at Saclay, in the Biochemistry Division headed by Pierre Fromageot. In 1990, he launched the “Protein 2000” project, taking charge of it in 1991. That same year, he became head of the Department of Protein Engineering and Research (DIEP) within the Life Sciences Division, a position he held until 2006.

In 2000, he received the Redi Award from the International Society of Toxicology (IST). In 2006, he was appointed president of this society.

In 2002, André Ménez became one of the leaders of the national program to combat nuclear, radiological, biological, and chemical risks.

From 2003 to 2005, he held the position of research delegate at the National Museum of Natural History, France. He participates in teaching courses on venomous and poisonous animals, and gives a series of lectures on protein chemistry at the National University of Singapore every year. In 2006, he became the second president of this institution since the 2002 reform, succeeding Bernard Chevassus-au-Louis.He died after a year and a half in office, and Gilles Boeuf succeeded him in 2009.
