= Belinda Cowling =

French medical researcher

Belinda S. Cowling
- Education: Monash University
- Occupation: Medical researcher
- Known for: Cofounder of Dynacure

Belinda S. Cowling is a French medical researcher and cofounder and scientific advisor of the biotech firm Dynacure, which was founded in 2016. She became Head of Research in 2018, responsible for the company’s R&D strategy, and leading Dynacure’s research programs in centronuclear myopathy (CNM) and other disease domains. As Dynacure's Chief Scientific Officer, her focus is on translational research and drug-candidate development. In 2019, she was awarded the Irène Joliot-Curie Prize in the category: Women, Research and Enterprise.

== Life and work ==
Cowling earned her PhD at Monash University in Melbourne, Australia, in 2008. She moved to France to take an internship at the Institute of Genetics, Molecular and Cellular Biology (IGBMC), Strasbourg, and joined the team of Jocelyn Laporte where she studied the normal biological function of the protein, dynamin-2 (DNM2). She identified downregulation of this gene as a novel therapeutic target for centronuclear myopathies. She is the author of five patents, two of which were key in creating Dynacure.

Cowling's research primarily concerns neuromuscular diseases, degenerative diseases, rare pathologies that affect about 110 people per year in France and orphan diseases (illnesses for which no treatment is available). The research strategy that she set up allows the pathology to be tackled on several fronts, from fundamental aspects to clinical trials.

Cowling also trains PhD students and young researchers, and teaches at the master and PhD levels in Australia and France.

== Awards and distinctions ==
- "Young Researcher" prize of the French Society of Cellular and Gene Therapy (SFTCG), 2014
- Irène Joliot-Curie Prize in the category Women, Research and Enterprise, 2019
- "Prix Scientifique, The Espoirs de l'Université de Strasbourg, 2019

== Selected publications ==
- Cowling, Belinda S., Meagan J. McGrath, Mai-Anh Nguyen, Denny L. Cottle, Anthony J. Kee, Susan Brown, Joachim Schessl et al. "Identification of FHL1 as a regulator of skeletal muscle mass: implications for human myopathy." The Journal of cell biology 183, no. 6 (2008): 1033-1048.
- Schessl, Joachim, Yaqun Zou, Meagan J. McGrath, Belinda S. Cowling, Baijayanta Maiti, Steven S. Chin, Caroline Sewry et al. "Proteomic identification of FHL1 as the protein mutated in human reducing body myopathy." The Journal of clinical investigation 118, no. 3 (2008): 904-912.
- Cowling, Belinda S., Denny L. Cottle, Brendan R. Wilding, Colleen E. D’Arcy, Christina A. Mitchell, and Meagan J. McGrath. "Four and a half LIM protein 1 gene mutations cause four distinct human myopathies: a comprehensive review of the clinical, histological and pathological features." Neuromuscular Disorders 21, no. 4 (2011): 237-251.
- Cowling, Belinda S., Anne Toussaint, Leonela Amoasii, Pascale Koebel, Arnaud Ferry, Laurianne Davignon, Ichizo Nishino, Jean-Louis Mandel, and Jocelyn Laporte. "Increased expression of wild-type or a centronuclear myopathy mutant of dynamin 2 in skeletal muscle of adult mice leads to structural defects and muscle weakness." The American journal of pathology 178, no. 5 (2011): 2224-2235.
- Cowling, Belinda S., Thierry Chevremont, Ivana Prokic, Christine Kretz, Arnaud Ferry, Catherine Coirault, Olga Koutsopoulos, Vincent Laugel, Norma B. Romero, and Jocelyn Laporte. "Reducing dynamin 2 expression rescues X-linked centronuclear myopathy." The Journal of clinical investigation 124, no. 3 (2014): 1350-1363.
- Prokic, Ivana, Belinda S. Cowling, and Jocelyn Laporte. "Amphiphysin 2 (BIN1) in physiology and diseases." Journal of molecular medicine 92, no. 5 (2014): 453-463.
