= Agnès Bernet =

French cell biologist (born 1968)

- Born: 1968 (age 57–58)
- Education: University Claude Bernard Lyon I
- Occupations: Scientific director, Netris Pharma
- Known for: Co-founder of NETRIS Pharma

Agnès Bernet (born 1968) is a French cell biologist and professor of cancer biology at the University Claude Bernard Lyon I. A co-founder of NETRIS Pharma, she has led within the Laboratory of Apoptosis, Cancer and Development, the research team that validated the use of interference ligand/dependence receptors as novel targeted therapies for cancer.

== Life and work ==
Bernet earned her PhD at University Claude Bernard Lyon I in 1994 with the thesis Etude, par recombinaison homologue, de régions régulatrices de l'expression des gènes de globine alpha humains (Study, by homologous recombination, of regulatory regions of the expression of human alpha globin genes). Her research focused on the study of two regions that may be involved in the activation of human alpha globin genes during erythroid differentiation.

In 2008, she co-founded the company Netris Pharma SAS, where she serves as scientific director and coordinates numerous research projects concerning clinical therapies relating to cancer. In particular, her work on Netrin-1, the antibody developed by her team, is an antitumor product that has been tested in humans in clinical trials at the Center Léon Bérard.

Her work has focused on a new therapeutic target, dependence receptors. These are pairs of receptors/ligands that are deregulated in cancers. The first prototype therapeutic molecule was an antibody against the ligand Netrin-1, overexpressed in many types of cancer. This antibody causes the death of tumor cells.

Bernet was named a junior member of the Institut Universitaire de France in 2008, which was a five-year appointment. In 2015, she received the Irène Joliot-Curie Prize in the Women and Business category for her work in both teaching and researching cancer therapies.

== Selected publications ==
- Bernet, A. (1994). Etude, par recombinaison homologue, de régions régulatrices de l'expression des gènes de globine α humains (Doctoral dissertation, University Claude Bernard Lyon I). (In French).
- Bernet, A., Mazelin, L., Coissieux, M. M., Gadot, N., Ackerman, S. L., Scoazec, J. Y., & Mehlen, P. (2007). Inactivation of the UNC5C Netrin-1 receptor is associated with tumor progression in colorectal malignancies. Gastroenterology, 133(6), 1840-1848.
- Bernet, A., & Mehlen, P. (2007). Dependence receptors: when apoptosis controls tumor progression. Bulletin du cancer, 94(4), 10012-10017.
- Bernet, A., & Fitamant, J. (2008). Netrin-1 and its receptors in tumour growth promotion. Expert opinion on therapeutic targets, 12(8), 995-1007.
- Bellina, M., & Bernet, A. (2022). La nétrine-1, une nouvelle cible antitumorale (Netrin-1, a new antitumor target). médecine/sciences, 38(4), 351-358. (In French).

== Awards and distinctions ==
- Knight of the Legion of Honor
- Irène Joliot-Curie Prize (2015)
- Bernet is listed as an inventor of several patents
