= Margaret Maruani =

French sociologist (1954–2022)

- Born: 25 February 1954; Tunis, French Tunisia
- Died: 4 August 2022 (aged 68); Valencia, Spain
- Other name: Margaret Rose Maruani Rey
- Citizenship: French
- Occupations: Sociologist; director of research
- Awards: CNRS Silver Medal; Legion of Honour; Doctor honoris causa; Université libre de Bruxelles; Ordre national du Mérite

Academic background
- Thesis: "L'expression des problèmes féminins dans les syndicats et à travers les conflits sociaux" (published in 1979 under the title, Les syndicats à l’épreuve du féminisme)
- Doctoral advisor: Jean-Daniel Reynaud

Academic work
- Discipline: Sociology
- Sub-discipline: Sociology and gender applied to questions of work and employment
- Institutions: French National Centre for Scientific Research (CNRS)
- Notable works: Travail, Genre et Sociétés

Margaret Rose Maruani Rey (25 February 1954 – 4 August 2022) was a Tunisian-born French sociologist and director of research at the French National Centre for Scientific Research (CNRS) in Paris. She was the founder and editor-in-chief of the academic journal, Travail, Genre et Sociétés and directed the international and multidisciplinary research network "Marché du travail et Genre" (MAGE–CNRS) ('Labour Market and Gender').

== Early life and education ==
Margaret Rose Maruani was born 25 February 1954, in Tunis, Tunisia. She arrived in France with her family in 1967. She studied at Sciences Po (1975), and then pursued a diploma in Sociology at the Instituts d'études politiques (IEP) in Paris (1976). She defended her doctoral thesis in Sociology at the IEP in Paris in 1978. Her thesis, entitled "L'expression des problèmes féminins dans les syndicats et à travers les conflits sociaux" (The expression of women's problems in unions and through social conflicts) was supervised by Jean-Daniel Reynaud. It was published in 1979 under the title, Les syndicats à l’épreuve du féminisme (Unions put to the test by feminism).

== Career and research ==
Maruani began her career in 1976 as a research fellow at the Conservatoire national des arts et métiers (CNAM), in the sociology of work laboratory. She was then appointed Assistant, and in 1983, became a CNRS researcher, attached to CNAM's sociology of work laboratory. In 1991, she passed the requirements to direct research at the IEP in Paris, under the direction of Jean-Daniel Reynaud and joined the "Centre de sociologie urbaine" (Center for Urban Sociology). In 1992, Maruani was promoted to research director at CNRS. Three years later, she founded the MAGE–CNRS research group, the first research group on gender at CNRS. In 1999, she established the academic journal, Travail, genre et sociétés, of which she then became the editor-in-chief, before becoming its editorial advisor.

She taught for several years at the University of Geneva, as guest professor in 2002 and 2003, then as full professor and director of gender studies, from 2005 to 2009, and again as guest professor since 2012. In 2006, she created the Master in Gender Studies there.

Since 2010, she was attached to the "Centre de recherche sur les liens sociaux" (CERLIS) (Centre for Research on Social Ties), CNRS laboratory-Paris Descartes University. She directed MAGE, which in 2011, became an international and multidisciplinary research network "Labour market and gender" which now brings together 30 universities and research centres in 13 countries.

Maruani's research focused on women's work, employment and trade unionism and on the analysis of the labor market and employment from a gender perspective. She thus articulates research and feminist commitment. She is one of the pioneers in France and internationally in the field of studies crossing sociology and gender applied to questions of work and employment. She was also one of the pioneers in the institutionalisation of the field of gender studies. Her publications have been translated into many languages.

== Awards and honours ==
- CNRS Silver Medal (2014)
- Knight of the Legion of Honour (2013)
- Doctor honoris causa of the Université libre de Bruxelles (2000)
- Knight of the Ordre national du Mérite (1998)

== Selected works ==
=== Books ===
- Travail et genre dans le monde. L'état des savoirs (ed.), Paris, La Découverte, 2013
- Un siècle de travail des femmes en France 1901–2011, Paris, La Découverte, 2012 (with Monique Meron)
- Travail et genre. Regards croisés France, Europe, Amérique latine, Paris, La Découverte, Coll. "Recherches", 2008 (with Helena Hirata and Maria Rosa Lombardi, eds.)
- Femmes, genre et sociétés. L'état des savoirs (ed.), Paris, La Découverte, 2005
- Le travail du genre. Les sciences sociales du travail à l'épreuve des différences de sexe, Paris, La Découverte, Coll. "Recherches", 2003 (with Jacqueline Laufer and Catherine Marry, eds.)
- Les mécomptes du chômage, Paris, Bayard, 2002
- Masculin-féminin : questions pour les sciences de l'homme, Paris, PUF, 2001 (with Jacqueline Laufer and Catherine Marry)
- Travail et emploi des femmes, Paris, La Découverte, coll. "Repères", 2000 (4th edition updated 2011)
- Les Nouvelles frontières de l'inégalité. Hommes et femmes sur le marché du travail (ed.), Paris, La Découverte, Coll. "Recherches", 1998
- avec Emmanuèle Reynaud, Sociologie de l'emploi, Paris, La Découverte, Coll. "Repères", 1993 (2nd edition updated 1999, 3rd edition updated 2001, 4th edition updated 2004).
- Au labeur des dames, métiers masculins, emplois féminins, Paris, Syros, 1989 (with C. Nicole)
- La flexibilité en Italie, Paris, Syros, 1989 (with E. Reynaud and C. Romani, eds.)
- Le temps des chemises. La grève qu'elles gardent au cœur, Paris, Syros, 1982 (with A. Borzeix)
