= Irène Joliot-Curie Prize =

French prize for women in science and technology

The Irène Joliot-Curie Prize is a French prize for women in science and technology, founded in 2001. It is awarded by the Ministry of Higher Education, Research and Innovation, the Airbus Group corporate foundation, the French Academy of Sciences and the Academy of Technologies. It aims to reward women for their work in the fields of science and technology.

The prize is named after French scientist Irène Joliot-Curie, a French chemist, physicist and politician who won the Nobel Prize in Chemistry in 1935 for the discovery of artificial radioactivity. The prize was created by a new government department called the Mission for Parity in Science and Technology. It was led by Françoise Cyrot-Lackmann who had co-created the Femmes et Sciences organisation.

Each year three awards are given:

1. female scientist of the year
2. young female scientist
3. a woman in business and technology

Until 2009, a fourth category of awards was given, to an individual or group in recognition of their mentorship of women in science.

In 2023, a new category was recognised in a special prize for engagement.

Since 2011, the award winners have been chosen by the French Academy of Sciences and the French Academy of Technologies.

The current Irène Joliot-Curie Prize should not be confused with the Prix Joliot-Curie, set up by Société Française de Physique in 1956, an annual award for work in the field of physics. It was originally called the prix Irène-Joliot-Curie, before changing its name in 1958.

== Winners ==
The winners have included:

Year	Female scientist of the year	Young female scientist	Woman in business and technology	Mentorship / Engagement
2023	Anne Canteaut	Virginie Galland Ehrlacher; Claire de March; Laurette Piani	Marilena Radoiu	Olga Paris-Romaskevich
2022	Bérengère Dubrulle	Nina Hadis Amini	Marjorie Cavarroc-Weimer	
2021	Julie Grollier	Cécile Charrier	Odile Hembise Fanton d’Andon	
2020	Fariba Adelkhah	Céline Guivarch	Sandrine Lévêque-Fort	
2019	Françoise Lamnabhi-Lagarrigue	Sophie Postel-Vinay	Belinda Cowling	
2018		Lenka Zdeborova	Dinh Thuy Phan Huy	
2017	Nathalie Palanque-Delabrouille	Hélène Morlon	Aline Gouget	
2016	Françoise Briquel-Chatonnet	Nathalie Carrasco	Sylvaine Neveu	
2015	Leticia Cugliandolo	Rut Carballido Lopez	Agnès Bernet	
2014	Hélène Olivier-Bourbigou	Virginie Courtier-Orgogozo	Séverine Sigrist	
2013	Valérie Masson-Delmotte	Wiebke Drenckhan and Claire Wyart	Véronique Newland	
2012	Marina Cavazzana-Calvo	Bénédicte Menez	Isabelle Buret	
2011	Anne-Marie Lagrange	Laure Saint-Raymond	Pascale Vicat-Blanc	
2010	Alessandra Carbone	Anne Peyroche	Françoise Soussaline	
2009	Michèle Leduc	Virginie Bonnaillie-Noël	Malika Haimeur	AFFDU – Association française des femmes diplômées des universités
2008	Brigitte Senut	Katell Berthelot	Catherine Langlais	Catherine Marry
2007	Monique Combescure	Hakima Mendil-Jakani	Magali Vaissière	Marie-Paule Cani
2006	Cecilia Ceccarelli	Julia Kempe	Françoise Heilmann-Pascal	
2005	Rose Dieng-Kuntz	Béatrice Chatel		Ingénieur-e de demain de l’association OPE-URIS
2004	Anne-Marie Jolly-Desodt		Marie-Françoise Roy	Société internationale pour l'étude des femmes de l'Ancien Régime
2003	Françoise Héritier		Muriel Thomasset	Femmes Ingénieurs
1980	Marie-Claude Lemaire			
