= Catherine Marry =

French sociologist

- Born: Catherine Guyon
- Education: Aix-Marseille University
- Occupation: Sociologist

Catherine Marry (née Guyon) is a French sociologist. Her research concerns the sociology of education, the sociology of work and gender studies. She was awarded an Irène Joliot-Curie Prize in 2008 for her mentorship activities and is a research director emeritus at the French research center, CNRS.

== Biography ==
After studying economics and sociology at the university now called Aix-Marseille University, Marry began her career in 1972 in Aix-en-Provence at the Laboratoire d'Economie et de Sociologie du Travail (LEST). In 1986, she continued her research in Paris at the Laboratory of Secondary Analysis and Methods Applied to Sociology (LASMAS), which became known as the Maurice Halbwachs Center in 2006.

In 1991, Marry joined the French National Centre for Scientific Research (CNRS) to research career inequalities between women and men in male-dominated professions such as engineering. In 1995, she created the European research group called MAGE (for Labor Market and Gender) with Margaret Maruani and other gender specialists.

In March 2022, Marry defended her post-doctoral Habilitation degree and her thesis titled, The academic excellence of girls: the example of graduates from the great scientific and engineering schools.

From 2006 until her retirement, she was director of the Professions-Networks-Organizations team at the Maurice Halbwachs Center, where she conducted research on the gendered comparison of careers in the arts professions. Since her retirement, she continues her work at CNRS as Director of Research Emeritus.

Marry is a member of the editorial board of the journal Sociologie du travail and a member of the scientific committee of the journals Travail, genre et sociétés and Nouvelles Questions Féministes. She is also a member of the pedagogical council of the master's degree program in "Gender, Politics and Sexuality" at School for Advanced Studies in the Social Sciences (EHESS3).

== Selected publications ==
- Marry, Catherine. "Femmes ingénieurs: une (ir) résistible ascension?." Social Science Information 28, no. 2 (1989): 291–344.
- Marry, Catherine. "Genre et professions académiques: esquisse d’un état des lieux dans la sociologie." Réflexions sur l’Accès, la Promotion et les Responsabilités des Hommes et des Femmes à l’École des Hautes Études en Sciences Sociales. Disponível em http://www. lism. cnrs-mrs. fr/EBãfiles/Resources/DocFemmes/colloquesEHESS. pdf (2003).
- Marry, Catherine, and Irène Jonas. "Chercheuses entre deux passions." Travail, genre et sociétés 2 (2005): 69–88.
- Marry, Catherine. "Le plafond de verre dans le monde académique: l'exemple de la biologie." Idées économiques et sociales 3 (2008): 36–47.
- Marry, Catherine, Laure Bereni, Alban Jacquemart, Fanny Le Mancq, Sophie Pochic, and Anne Revillard. "Le genre des administrations. La fabrication des inégalités de carrière entre hommes et femmes dans la haute fonction publique." Revue française d'administration publique 1 (2015): 45–68.
- Marry, Catherine, Laure Bereni, Alban Jacquemart, Sophie Pochic, and Anne Revillard. Le plafond de verre et l'État. Armand Colin, 2017.

== Distinctions ==
- 2008: Irène Joliot-Curie Prize, mentorship category
- 2010: Medal of Merit
- 2016: Chevalier, Legion of Honor
- 2019: Honorary Doctorate, University of Liège, Belgium
