= Buret =

Buret may refer to:

- Burette laboratory equipment

== Surname ==
- Isabelle Buret
- Maurice Buret
- Timothé Buret (born 1995), French racing driver

== Toponymy ==
- Le Buret, France
- Buret District, a former district of Kenya
- Buret', archaeological site in Siberia
