= Anne Peyroche =

French biologist and geneticist

- Born: Anne Marthe Alice Smal
- Education: Pierre-et-Marie-Curie University
- Occupations: Biologist, geneticist
- Spouse: Gérald Peyroche
- Children: 2

Anne Peyroche (born Anne Marthe Alice Smal) is a French biologist and geneticist. From October 2017 to January 2018, she acted as interim president of the National Center for Scientific Research (CNRS) until fraud allegations were made.

== Biography ==
Anne Peyroche studied at the Ecole Normale Supérieure (ENS) in Cachan and graduated in 1994 with a major in biochemistry and biological engineering. In 1995, she obtained a DEA in cellular and molecular biology. She joined the Pierre-et-Marie-Curie University and in 1999, she defended her thesis on the exchange factors of the G ARF protein involved in intracellular trafficking.

The same year, she joined the French Alternative Energies and Atomic Energy Commission (CEA) and first conducted research on intracellular protein trafficking, then on DNA damage responses and finally on proteasome assembly. In 2013, she became deputy director of the molecular genetics and cell fate laboratory (CNRS/CEA/ Paris-Sud University). She led the "Proteasome and responses to DNA damage" team.

=== Administrative functions ===
In May 2014, she joined the Secretary of State for Higher Education and Research as an advisor in charge of research and advised ministers Geneviève Fioraso and Thierry Mandon. She was appointed Deputy Chief of Staff in charge of research in September 2015. Deputy Director General for Science at the CNRS on 15 January 2016, and interim president of the CNRS replacing Alain Fuchs on 24 October 2017.

Only a few weeks after her appointment, questions arose about work she carried out between 2001 and 2012, when she was employed by the CEA. The questions appeared on the PubPeer research site. As a result, Antoine Petit, president of French Institute for Research in Computer Science and Automation (Inria) was appointed to replace her as head of the CNRS.

=== Fraud allegations ===
On 19 January 2018, the CEA opened an internal investigation about suspicions of manipulation in the figures of five of her scientific articles. In November 2018, the laboratory notebooks and the hard disks were appraised and the CEA experts concluded that certain allegations were serious. In January 2018, the CEA appointed the immunologist Jean-François Bach, member of the national ethics advisory committee, as chairman of the commission of inquiry responsible for evaluating the five incriminated articles in an advisory capacity. Beginning October 2018, the newspapers L'Express and Le Monde, alleged that the report of the French Academy of Sciences which confirms suspicions of scientific misconduct had been "buried" since May. The CEA considered the procedure is suspended pending the hearing of the researcher.

Nine months after the start of the disciplinary procedure, the CEA took the decision not to apply a disciplinary sanction. The ministry "denies the allegations of L'Express, which affirms that the minister Frédérique Vidal would have asked not to sanction Anne Peyroche," whereas Sylvestre Huet, member of the Council of scientific integrity, writes to Frédérique Vidal that an "intolerable suspicion of intervention" and obstruction of the process of dealing with the fault committed, sends "a disastrous message to the scientific community." In 2020, the CEA was scheduled to publish the full report of the Committee chaired by Jean-François Bach and set up to examine this file. The CEA concluding that "wrongful negligence constitutes breaches of scientific integrity likely to damage the image of the organization and more generally of research."

=== Personal life ===
She is married to researcher Gérald Peyroche and has two children.

== Distinctions ==
- 2009: Victor Noury, Thorlet, Henri Becquerel, Jules and Augusta Lazare prize from the Académie des sciences
- 2010: Irène-Joliot-Curie Prize in the young female scientist category
- 2011: Knight of the National Order of Merit
