= Rut Carballido Lopez =

Spanish-born microbiologist

- Education: University of Oxford
- Occupation: Microbiologist
- Known for: Irène-Joliot-Curie Prize in 2015

Rut Carballido Lopez also spelled Carballido-Lopez is a Spanish-born microbiologist and research team leader in France. She won an Irène-Joliot-Curie Prize in 2015.

== Biography ==
Carballido Lopez left her home in Spain for Lyon, France, at the age of 17 and became part of the first graduating class of Eurinsa, the European section of the INSA Lyon First Cycle. (INSA stands for the Institut National des Sciences Appliqués, and is one of France’s top engineering schools).

She earned her Ph.D. at University of Oxford, United Kingdom, where she researched bacteria that possess homologues of eukaryotic actin, namely MreB proteins, that control cell shape.

Carballido Lopez leads the prokaryotic cell development team, at the Micalis Institute, a joint research unit that links work from Institut national de la recherche agronomique (INRAE), AgroParisTech and Paris-Saclay University. The institute is a member of the European Molecular Biology Organization and is headed by Philippe Noirot, assisted by five deputy directors, one of whom is Carballido Lopez.

Carballido Lopez has worked on the roles of bacterial actins in different cellular processes, particularly in morphogenesis, to better understand how the cell wall of bacteria is controlled and explores the role of cytoskeleton in this process.

She is an editor of The Cell Surface, a scientific journal published by Elsevier.

== Selected awards and distinctions ==
Carballido Lopez received the Irène-Joliot-Curie Young Woman Scientist Prize in 2015 for her research.

== Selected publications ==
- Carballido-López, Rut and Jeff Errington. "The bacterial cytoskeleton: in vivo dynamics of the actin-like protein Mbl of Bacillus subtilis." Developmental cell 4, no. 1 (2003): 19-28.
- Carballido-López, Rut and Jeff Errington. "A dynamic bacterial cytoskeleton." Trends in cell biology 13, no. 11 (2003): 577-583.
- Carballido-López, Rut. "The bacterial actin-like cytoskeleton." Microbiology and Molecular Biology Reviews 70, no. 4 (2006): 888-909.
- Carballido-López, Rut and Alex Formstone. "Shape determination in Bacillus subtilis." Current opinion in microbiology 10, no. 6 (2007): 611-616.
