= Cecilia Ceccarelli =

Italian astronomer

Cecilia Ceccarelli is an Italian astronomer known for her research on astrochemistry and the spectroscopy of protostars. She was named as the female scientist of the year in the 2006 Irène Joliot-Curie Prizes.

Ceccarelli completed her Ph.D. in 1982 at Sapienza University of Rome. She has been associated with the Institut de planétologie et d'astrophysique de Grenoble in France since 2003.

She was elected to the Academia Europaea in 2024.
