= Nathalie Carrasco =

French atmospheric chemist

- Born: 1977 (age 48–49)
- Education: ENS Cachan; Paris Diderot University; University of Versailles-Saint-Quentin-en-Yvelines
- Occupations: Chemist, professor of astronomy and astrophysics
- Known for: Recipient Irène Joliot-Curie Prize; Chevalier of the National Order of Merit

Nathalie Marie Carrasco (born in 1977) is a French chemist and professor of astronomy and astrophysics. She is a specialist in atmospheric chemistry at the Atmosphere, Environments and Space Observations Laboratory (LATMOS) at the University of Versailles-Saint-Quentin-en-Yvelines. In 2016, she was awarded the Irène Joliot-Curie Prize in the category Young Woman Scientist.

== Biography ==
Nathalie Carrasco attended the ENS Cachan where she earned her baccalaureate. She first became interested in chemistry and defended her Ph.D. thesis in 2005 at the University of Paris 7, in the inter-university Laboratory of Atmospheric Systems (LISA), on terrestrial air quality. The same year, when the European lander Huygens landed on Titan, a satellite of Saturn, its findings revealed the complexity of Titan's atmosphere and the need for chemists to work on it. Carrasco targeted Titan in her work.

She earned her post-doctoral habilitation at the University of Versailles-Saint-Quentin-en-Yvelines in 2012.

=== Research ===
As part of a European research project called “ERC,” Carrasco has been studying the upper atmosphere of Titan, in which an intense prebiotic chemistry develops.

Carrasco directed the Pampre laboratory experiment, aimed at simulating Titan's atmosphere. Because it is close to that of the Earth before the appearance of life, understanding Titan's atmosphere contributes to understanding the first appearance of life on Earth. This work complements the data collected by the Cassini–Huygens probe. She has also led the physical-chemistry team of Ionized Atmospheres at LATMOS in Saint-Quentin-en-Yvelines, which is also focused on Titan.

=== Memberships ===
In 2015, Carrasco was in charge of the gender parity mission at the University of Versailles-Saint-Quentin-en-Yvelines.

She has served as a junior member of the Institut Universitaire de France since 2013 and is a member of the National Committee for National Center for Scientific Research (CNRS) in astronomy and astrophysics.

== Awards and distinctions ==
Carrasco received the Irène Joliot-Curie Prize for Young Woman Scientist of the Year in 2016 for her research on the atmospheric reactivity conducive to the emergence of life.

She was named Chevalier of the National Order of Merit in 2017 for her research on Titan.
