= Françoise Soussaline =

French biophysicist and businesswoman

- Born: September 3, 1945 (age 80)
- Education: Pierre and Marie Curie University
- Awards: Chevalière de l'ordre national de la Légion d'honneur (1997); Chevalière de l'ordre national de la Légion d'honneur (2001); Irène Joliot-Curie Prize dans la catégorie parcours femme entreprise (2010)
- Scientific career
- Fields: Molecular Spectroscopy; Biomedical Physics
- Workplaces: IMSTAR; BioCRITT; SME of the MEDICEN Paris Region competitiveness cluster

Françoise Soussaline (née Yerouchalmi) is a French biophysicist and businesswoman, a specialist in cell imaging.

== Education and career ==
She studied physics at the Pierre and Marie Curie University and completed a PhD in molecular spectroscopy in 1973. She began her career as a researcher at Inserm, where she was involved in the development of the first digital scanner in nuclear medicine. She then joined the Frédéric-Joliot hospital department of the French Alternative Energies and Atomic Energy Commission where she developed Positron emission tomography locally as part of a second thesis in biophysics completed in 1984 at the University of Paris-Sud under the direction of Nobel Prize winner Georges Charpak. She became associate professor in Physics and Medical Biophysics at the Pierre and Marie Curie University and the University of Paris-Sud.

In 1985, she founded the company IMSTAR, which designs, develops and markets automated imaging systems for life-sciences research and diagnostic tests for genetic disorders and cancers.

From 1994 to 2008, she served as the president of BioCRITT Ile de France

Between 2007 and 2009, she was vice-president of the fr:Pôles de compétitivité en Île-de-France fr:Medicen (Medicen [business] competition clusters in the Île-de-France region). She is also a member of the supervisory board of the Paris Region Innovation Centre.

She is an active supporter of equality for women in science. She has been part of the association fr:Femmes et Sciences since its creation in 2000 and promotes science as a career choice amongst girls in secondary schools.

== Recognition ==
- 1997: Chevalière de l'ordre national de la Légion d'honneur (Knight of the National Order of the Legion of Honour], for 27 years' professional service.
- 2001: Officière de l'ordre national de la Légion d'honneur (Officer of the National Order of the Legion of Honour], for 30 years' professional activities.
- 2010: Irène Joliot-Curie Prize dans la catégorie parcours femme entreprise [Irène-Joliot-Curie prize for women's business innovation in science].
