= Bérengère Dubrulle =

French astrophysicist (born 1965)

Bérengère Dubrulle (born 1965) is a French astrophysicist whose research involves the study of turbulence and vortices in fluid dynamics and magnetohydrodynamics, and their application in modeling planet formation and climate change. She is a director of research for the French National Centre for Scientific Research, and the director of the École de physique des Houches.

== Education and career ==
Dubrulle was born in 1965 in Dieppe, on the north coast of France. She was a student at the École normale supérieure de jeunes filles from 1985 to 1989, earning a master's degree in quantum mechanics in 1987 through Pierre and Marie Curie University and defending a Ph.D. in astrophysics in 1990 through Toulouse III - Paul Sabatier University under the direction of Jean-Paul Zahn. She completed a habilitation in physics in 1996, through Paris Diderot University.

Meanwhile, she became a scientist (chargée de recherche) in the French National Centre for Scientific Research (CNRS) in 1991, was promoted to director of research in 2000, and was named as director of research, exceptional class, in 2021. She is affiliated with the Sphynx laboratory (Systèmes Physiques Hors-équilibres hYdrodynamiques éNergie et compleXité, out-of-equilibrium Systems and Physics - HYdrodynamics - eNergy and compleXity) at CEA Paris-Saclay. Since 2020, she has also been director of the École de physique des Houches.

== Recognition ==
Dubrulle was the 2008 recipient of the Madame Victor Noury Prize of the French Academy of Sciences, and was named female scientist of the year as a recipient of the 2022 Irène Joliot-Curie Prize. She received the CNRS Bronze Medal in 1993, and the CNRS Silver Medal in 2017.

The European Geosciences Union gave Dubrulle the 2021 Lewis Fry Richardson Medal "for outstanding contributions to the field of geophysical and astrophysical turbulence, and for a unique approach to the study of experimental turbulent flows using statistical mechanics". She was named a Fellow of the American Physical Society (APS) in 2023, after a nomination from the APS Division of Fluid Dynamics, "for seminal contributions to the theory of fully developed turbulence and astro- and geophysical fluid dynamics in general, and in particular, for illuminating intermittency and the role of multiple states in turbulent flows".
