= Véronique Newland =

French optronics engineer, CEO

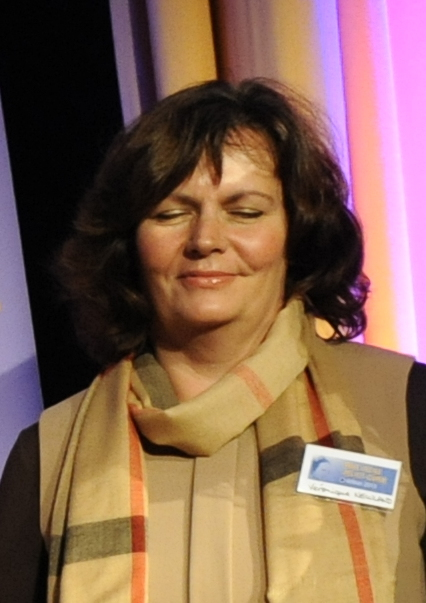
- Véronique Newland in 2013
- Born: 14 May 1965 (age 61)
- Education: University of Paris-XIII; Paris-Sud University
- Occupations: Optronics engineer, company CEO

Véronique Newland (born 14 May 1965) is a French engineer specializing in optronics. She is the CEO of New Vision Technologies, which develops industrial and scientific vision projects. In 2013, she received the Irène-Joliot-Curie Prize in the women's business career category. She has been a member of the board of directors of the French association of photonic optics since September 2016.

== Biography ==
Newland earned her baccalaureate in mathematics and natural sciences, and then took jobs as a supermarket cashier, salesperson and bank employee where she observed the different ways that technology was impacting the banking industry and customer interactions. She was particularly interested in the introduction of automatic teller machines (ATMs) and the development of other computing systems to serve bank customers. She enrolled in a DUT program in computer science to become a programmer analyst and in 1989, Newland passed her DUT in computer science at the IUT de Villetaneuse at the University of Paris-XIII.

She was hired by a company that created analog and digital measurement systems. There she was introduced to the science of how physical phenomena could be transformed into electrical signals, including the collection, processing, restitution and analysis of data. To further explore the subject, she started on a work-study program to become an optronics engineer, which is a combination of optics, computer science and electronics. She enrolled at the Polytechnic School of Paris-Sud University in 1994 and finished her engineering degree in 1996 in optronics.

After her employer's company was dissolved, Newland created her own firm in 2002 called NEW VISION Technologies, to specialize in optical measurement and control for both industrial and scientific projects. As the company's CEO, she guides applications that have ranged from optimizing the industrial cutting of salmon slices to monitoring the position of French RER rail lines.

In an effort to encourage more women to pursue careers in science, Newland appears at schools to discuss her tasks as both an engineer and a company founder. In 2011, her advocacy work was featured in the SAN du Val Maubuée newspaper on the theme of women in business, which was the same subject for which she received an Irène-Joliot-Curie Prize in 2013.
