= Sandrine Lévêque-Fort =

French optical physicist

- Education: ESPCI Paris; Paris-Sorbonne University
- Known for: Super-resolution imaging
- Scientific career
- Workplaces: Paris-Saclay University; CNRS
- Website: Lévêque-Fort group

Sandrine Lévêque-Fort is a French optical physicist working in the field of Super-resolution imaging at Paris-Saclay University. She was the recipient of the French Minister of Higher Education, Research and Innovation Irène Joliot-Curie Prize in 2020.

== Education and career ==
Lévêque-Fort holds a master's degree from Paris-Sorbonne University and conducted her doctoral research at ESPCI Paris, which she completed in 2000. She then joined the Imperial College in London as a postdoctoral fellow, before joining the French National Centre for Scientific Research.

== Awards and honours ==
- 2020 Irène Joliot-Curie Prize
