= Anne-Marie Jolly-Desodt =

French engineer and academic

- Born: 8 August 1952 (age 74); Grenay (Pas-de-Calais), France
- Other name: Anne-Marie Jolly
- Education: L’Ecole Polytech Lille
- Occupations: Engineer, academic
- Known for: Irène Joliot-Curie Prize

Anne-Marie Jolly-Desodt, (born 8 August 1952), is a French engineer and academic. Also published as Anne-Marie Jolly, she was deputy director of Ensait from 2001 to 2005 and director of the École Polytechnique of the University of Orléans from 2008 to 2012. She received the Irène Joliot-Curie Prize as female scientist of the year in 2004.

== Life and work ==
Anne-Marie Jolly-Desodt was born in Grenay (Pas-de-Calais), France. At l’Ecole Polytech Lille, she earned her Masters's Degree in Engineering in 1974, her PhD in 1986 in Process Control and her habilitation in data fusion for man-machine systems and robotics, eco-conception in 1987.

She is a former professor and director at Polytech Orleans, and is vice president of the French engineering school accreditation – CTI. Throughout her career she has worked to promote the place of women engineers and scientists in the workplace, particularly within the French Association of Women Engineers.

She became vice-president of the Commission des Titres d'Ingénieur in July 2014.

== Honors and distinctions ==
- Irène-Joliot-Curie Prize for encouraging women to pursue scientific careers (2004)
- Knight of the Legion of Honor (2008)
- European Society for Engineering Education (SEFI) Fellowship Award (2019)

== Selected publications ==
- Aguezzoul, Aicha; Rabenasolo, Besoa; Jolly-Desodt, Anne-Marie (2006). "Multicriteria Decision Aid Tool for Third-Party Logistics Providers' Selection". 2006 International Conference on Service Systems and Service Management (PDF). pp. 912–916. doi:10.1109/ICSSSM.2006.320753. ISBN 1-4244-0451-7. S2CID 23245726.
- Ricquebourg, Vincent; Durand, David; Menga, David; Marhic, Bruno; Delahoche, Laurent; Loge, Christophe; Jolly-Desodt, Anne-Marie (2007). "Context Inferring in the Smart Home: An SWRL Approach". 21st International Conference on Advanced Information Networking and Applications Workshops (AINAW'07). pp. 290–295. doi:10.1109/AINAW.2007.130. ISBN 978-0-7695-2847-2. S2CID 11870175.
- Jolly, Anne-Marie; Leger, Christophe (2018). "French Engineering Universities: How They Deal with Entrepreneurship and Innovation". Engineering Education for a Smart Society. Advances in Intelligent Systems and Computing. Vol. 627. pp. 284–294. doi:10.1007/978-3-319-60937-9_22. ISBN 978-3-319-60936-2.
- Jolly, Anne Marie; Mahieu, Laurent (2016). "How Accreditation Agencies can Help the Necessary Changes of HEIs Towards Sustainable Development Practices". International Journal of Engineering Pedagogy. 6: 29. doi:10.3991/ijep.v6i1.5336. S2CID 31939162.
- Sánchez-Chaparro, Teresa; Remaud, Bernard; Gómez-Frías, Víctor; Duykaerts, Caty; Jolly, Anne-Marie (2022). "Benefits and challenges of cross-border quality assurance in higher education. A case study in engineering education in Europe". Quality in Higher Education. 28 (3): 308–325. doi:10.1080/13538322.2021.2004984. S2CID 244885158.
