= Jean-François Bach =

French immunologist (1940–2023)

- Born: 8 June 1940; Yvré-l'Évêque, Sarthe, France
- Died: 12 December 2023 (aged 83)
- Occupations: Medical professor, biologist and immunologist
- Scientific career
- Fields: Immunology

Jean-François Bach (8 June 1940 – 12 December 2023) was a French medical professor, biologist and immunologist. He was Secrétaire perpétuel honoraire of the Académie des sciences. Bach died on 12 December 2023, at the age of 83.

== Biography ==
Bach was the grandson of a professor of pharmacy and a former director of the ENS de Saint-Cloud and son of a professor of medicine in paediatrics. He was preparing for the Polytechnique exam in the preparatory class of the Louis-le-Grand high school. After a few months of special mathematics class he decided to change his orientation by choosing medicine.

Bach was Jean Hamburger's student at Necker Hospital. He received his doctorate in medicine in 1969 and in science in 1970. His science thesis gives rise to three articles in Nature.

Correspondent in 1977, he was elected in 1985 as a member of the Académie des sciences, where he was one of the two Secrétaires perpétuels from 2006 to 2015. He was also Professor Emeritus at the University of Paris-Descartes.

Bach was Director of Inserm Unit 25 (Renal Immunopathology) and CNRS Laboratory 122 (Allograft Immunology), while also directing the Claude Bernard Association's centre on autoimmune diseases.

Among its other activities and functions:

- Member of the Board of Directors of the Fondation de la Maison de la Chimie
- Secretary General of the Day Solvay Foundation
- Member of the National Consultative Ethics Committee
- Member of the Board of Directors of the Hubert Beuve Méry Association
- Vice-President of the Foundation for Medical Research for more than 20 years
- Chairman of the Scientific Council of the Gustave-Roussy Institute (1981-1987)
- Vice-Chairman of the Scientific Council of the Institut Pasteur (1982-1984)
- President of the Scientific Council of the League against Cancer (1987-1997)
- Vice-President of the University of Paris V (1992-1995)
- Vice-President of the International Society of Transplantation (1995-1996)
- Member of the Scientific Council of Assistance Publique (1995-2001)
- President of the Clinical Immunology Committee of the IUIS (International Union of Immunology Societies) (2000-2002)
- Member of the WHO Committee on Vaccine Safety
- Chairman of the Committee for the Review of the Science Programmes at the College and of the Scientific Commission of the Common Base
- President of the Jean Dausset Foundation Centre for the Study of Human Polymorphism

== Works ==
Bach published alone or in collaboration, nearly 700 articles as well as several scientific books, including his Traité d'immunologie (six French editions and translated into 3 languages).

His personal work concerned more particularly the study of subpopulations of T lymphocytes related to thymus activity; the characterization of thymic hormones and in particular thymulin, which he synthesized; the action of immunosuppressants (cyclosporin, antilymphocyte sera, monoclonal antibodies against Tlymphocytes).

Bach was interested in the mechanisms and treatments of autoimmune diseases and more specifically insulin-dependent diabetes. He played a decisive role in the implementation of treatments for this disease with ciclosporin and, more recently, with anti-CD3 monoclonal antibodies. Finally, he showed that the decrease in the frequency of infections in developed countries explained the increase in the incidence of autoimmune diseases (hygienist theory).

== Awards and distinctions ==
Among other awards and honours:

- Grand Prize of the Académie des sciences (Jaffé Prize) (1976)
- European Society of Clinical Investigation Award (1976)
- Gold medal of the European Society of Allergology and Clinical Immunology (1978)
- Prix du rayonnement français (1981)
- Member of the Académie nationale de Médecine (elected in 1990)
- Member of the Académie nationale de Pharmacie (elected in 1990)
- Antoine-Laurent Lavoisier Prize from the University of California (1993)
- Member of the Royal Belgian Academy of Medicine (elected in 1994)
- Prize of the Institute of Health Sciences (1998)
- Barbara Davis Prize from the University of Colorado (2000)
- Member of the British Academy of Medical Sciences (elected in 2006)

Bach was also:

- Commander of the Ordre of the Légion d'Honneur
- Commander of the Ordre National du Mérite
