= Virginie Courtier-Orgogozo =

French biologist

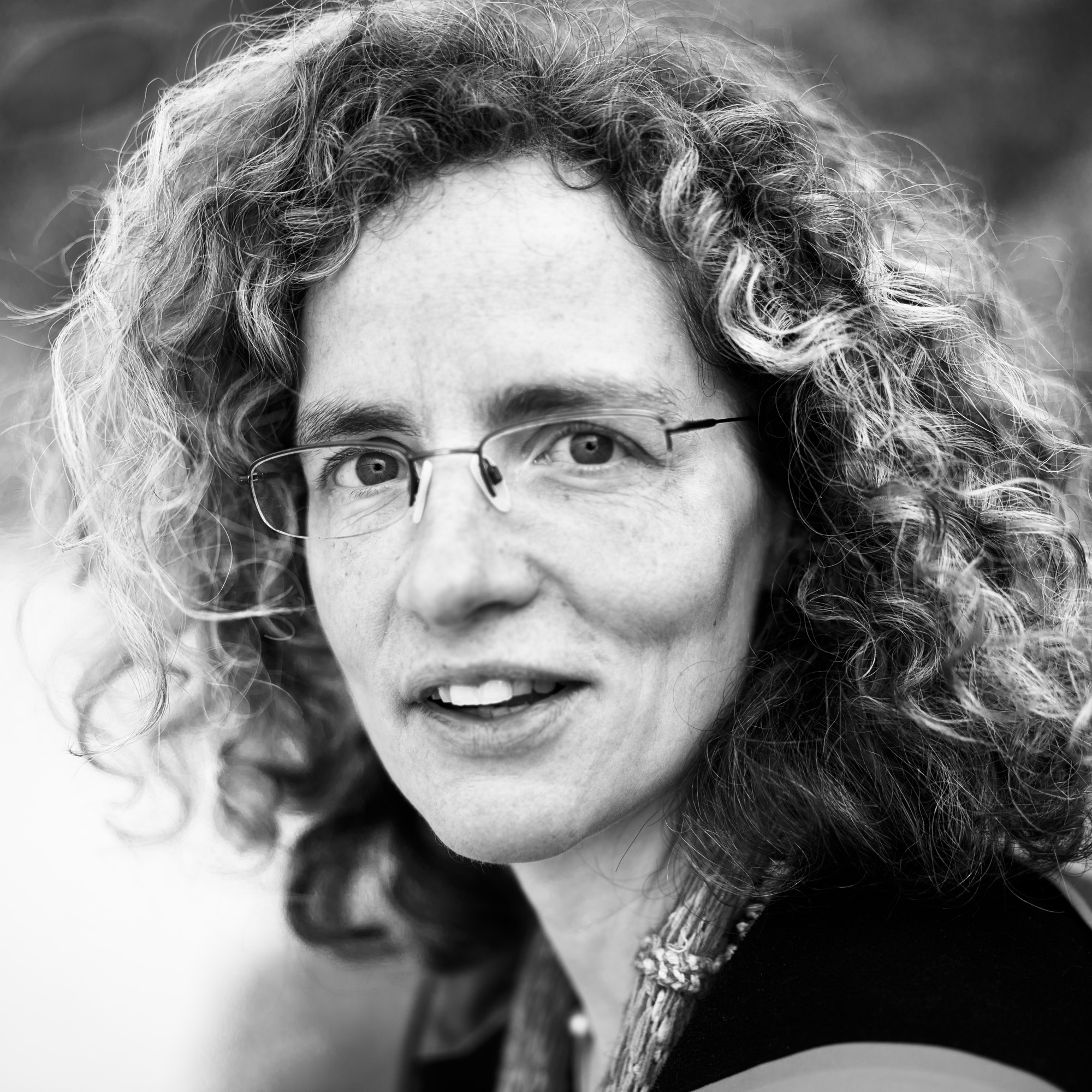
- Born: Virginie Courtier; Meaux, France
- Education: Ecole Normale Supérieure (ENS); Pierre and Marie Curie University; Princeton University
- Occupation: Biologist. CNRS research director

Virginie Courtier-Orgogozo is a French researcher of evolutionary biology and genetics. She is a research director at the French National Centre for Scientific Research (CNRS) and head of the Evolution & Genetics Team at the Institut Jacques Monod.

== Life and work ==
Born in Meaux, Courtier-Orgogozo took preparatory classes in Life and Earth Sciences so she could pursue a career in biology, and she graduated from Ecole Normale Supérieure (ENS). She earned her Ph.D. at Pierre and Marie Curie University with the thesis titled, Formation of sensory organs in D. Melanogaster: cell lineages, apoptosis and evolution supervised by François Schweisguth. She continued her post-doctoral work at Princeton before returning to France and joining the CNRS.

Her interests have centered on the molecular and cellular mechanisms that lead to the formation of a complex multicellular being from a single egg.

In April 2010, Courtier-Orgogozo began supervising an ATIP-AVENIR four-person team at the Institut Jacques Monod in Paris. In time, her team grew to ten people working in the Courtier-Orgogozo Laboratory who are studying several concrete cases of evolution in insects to identify general rules that govern the evolution of living beings.

The Irène Joliot-Curie Prize that she received in 2014 cited her research on mutations responsible for changes that occurred during the evolution of several species of Drosophila flies, to trace their evolutionary history and to better understand the fundamental mechanisms and the general understanding of their evolution, past and future.

== Awards and honors ==
- CNRS bronze medal (2014)
- Irène Joliot-Curie Prize, Young Woman Scientist category (2014)
- Knight of the National Order of Merit (2015)
- Lacassagne Prize, College of France (2018)

== Selected publications ==
- Courtier‐Orgogozo, V., Morizot, B., & Boëte, C. (2017). Agricultural pest control with CRISPR‐based gene drive: time for public debate: should we use gene drive for pest control?. EMBO reports, 18(6), 878-880.
- Courtier-Orgogozo, V., & Martin, A. (2020). The coding loci of evolution and domestication: current knowledge and implications for bio-inspired genome editing. Journal of Experimental Biology, 223(Suppl_1), jeb208934.
- Courtier-Orgogozo, V., Arnoult, L., Prigent, S. R., Wiltgen, S., & Martin, A. (2020). Gephebase, a database of genotype–phenotype relationships for natural and domesticated variation in Eukaryotes. Nucleic Acids Research, 48(D1), D696-D703.
- Courtier‐Orgogozo, V., Danchin, A., Gouyon, P. H., & Boëte, C. (2020). Evaluating the probability of CRISPR‐based gene drive contaminating another species. Evolutionary applications, 13(8), 1888-1905.
- Courtier-Orgogozo, V., & de Ribera, F. A. (2022). SARS-CoV-2 infection at the Huanan seafood market. Environmental Research, 113702.
