= Virginie Bonnaillie-Noël =

French mathematician

- Born: Virginie Bonnaillie; 3 October 1976 (age 49); Calais, France
- Education: Paris-Sud University; Ecole Normale Supérieure Paris-Saclay
- Occupations: Mathematician and research director
- Known for: Irène-Joliot-Curie Prize

Virginie Bonnaillie-Noël (born 3 October 1976 in Calais) is a French mathematician and research director specializing in numerical analysis. Her research topics concern partial differential equations, asymptotic, spectral and numerical analysis of problems arising from physics or mechanics.

== Life and work ==
After completing her preparatory classes at Faidherbe high school in Lille between 1994 and 1997, Bonnaillie-Noël entered Paris-Sud University where she obtained a bachelor's degree in 1998 and a master's degree in 1999. The same year, she was admitted to the Ecole Normale Supérieure Paris-Saclay (ENS) where she obtained the aggregation in 2000 with the option of numerical analysis. In 2001, she obtained a Diploma of Advanced Studies (DEA) in Numerical Analysis and Partial Differential Equations.

Between 2001 and 2003 she completed a thesis (as Virginie Bonnaillie) under the supervision of François Alouges and Bernard Helffer titled Mathematical analysis of superconductivity in a corner domain: semi-classical and numerical methods, which explored interdisciplinarity between physics and mathematics, at the border of numerical analysis, partial differential equations and spectral theory.

In 2004, she joined the Mathematical Research Institute of Rennes (IRMAR) as a research fellow. In 2011, she obtained authorization to direct research at the University of Rennes I. In 2014, she left IRMAR to direct research in the Mathematics and Applications Department of ENS.

In addition to her official work, Bonnaillie-Noël has frequently spoken about gender parity in science and research to encourage more young people to participate in the sciences.

== Distinctions ==
- 2008: CNRS bronze medal
- 2009: Irène-Joliot-Curie Prize in the young female scientist category
- 2011: Chevalier of the National Order of Merit by Cédric Villani
- 2021: Officer of the National Order of Merit

== Selected publications ==
- Bonnaillie-Noël, V., & Dauge, M. (2006, August). Asymptotics for the low-lying eigenstates of the Schrödinger operator with magnetic field near corners. In Annales Henri Poincaré (Vol. 7, No. 5, pp. 899–931). Birkhäuser-Verlag.
- Bonnaillie-Noël, V., & Fournais, S. (2007). Superconductivity in domains with corners. Reviews in Mathematical Physics, 19(06), 607-637.
- Bonnaillie-Noël, V., Dambrine, M., Tordeux, S., & Vial, G. (2009). Interactions between moderately close inclusions for the Laplace equation. Mathematical Models and Methods in Applied Sciences, 19(10), 1853-1882.
- Bonnaillie-Noël, V., Dambrine, M., Hérau, F., & Vial, G. (2010). On generalized Ventcel's type boundary conditions for Laplace operator in a bounded domain. SIAM journal on mathematical analysis, 42(2), 931-945.
- Bonnaillie-Noël, V., Helffer, B., & Vial, G. (2010). Numerical simulations for nodal domains and spectral minimal partitions. ESAIM: Control, Optimisation and Calculus of Variations, 16(1), 221-246.
