= Marina Cavazzana =

Italian physician and cellular biologist

- Marina Cavazzana
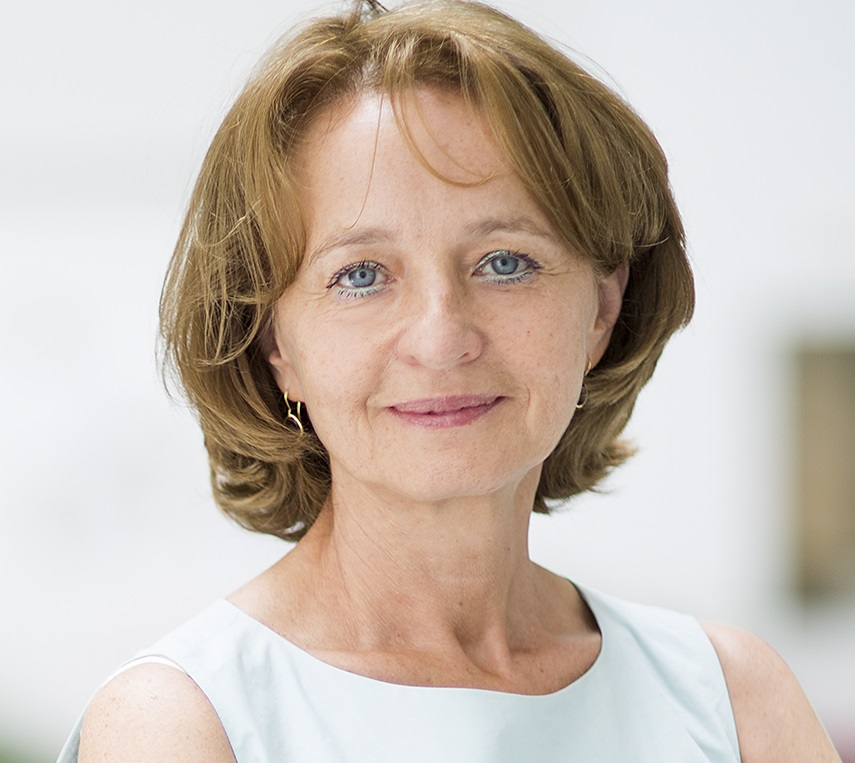
- Born: 1959 (age 66–67); Venice
- Education: University of Padua; Paris Diderot University
- Known for: Gene therapy
- Scientific career
- Workplaces: Necker-Enfants Malades Hospital; Paris Descartes University

Marina Cavazzana is a professor of Paediatric Immunology at the Necker-Enfants Malades Hospital and the Imagine Institute, as well as an academic at Paris Descartes University. She was awarded the Irène Joliot-Curie Prize in 2012 and elected to the National Academy of Medicine in 2019.

== Early life and education ==
Cavazzana was born in Venice. Her father worked on the railway and her mother was a teacher. She studied medicine in Padua, where she completed her residency at the University of Padua. She moved to Paris, where she earned her doctorate at the Paris Diderot University studying bone marrow transplants with Élaine Gluckman at the Hôpital Saint-Louis.

== Research and career ==
Cavazzana joined the Necker-Enfants Malades Hospital in 1987, where she worked with Alain Fischer and Claude Gricelli. She was appointed to Professor of Immunology in 1994. She served as Director of the Institut national de la santé et de la recherche médicale (INSERM) in 1994. In 2003 she was made Head of the Haematology Department and Director of Biotherapy at the Necker-Enfants Malades Hospital. She established the first Clinical Investigation Center in the Assistance Publique – Hôpitaux de Paris, which is the only French academic department is authorised to produce cell and gene therapies.

Her research considers the haematopoietic immune system and gene therapy. She has designed clinical trials based on lentiviral vector in gene therapy and pioneered the use of haematopoietic stem cell gene therapy for genetic immune and haematopoietic disorders. In 2002 Cavazzana started working with Philippe Leboulch trying to develop clinical protocols for the treatment of anemia. Cavazzana was the first doctor to successfully treat a boy with sickle cell disease, a severe form of hereditary chronic anemia. Sickle cell disease is a blood disorder that results from an abnormality in red blood cells. It occurs due to a mutation on the HBB gene, and results in a sickle-like deformity of red blood cells. It is the most common genetic disorder in France. The first gene therapy trail of young boys with X-linked severe combined immunodeficiency was performed by Cavazzana in collaboration with bluebird bio in 2000. When it was established that two of the boys developed leukaemia from the gene therapy, Cavazzana coordinated the medical efforts of biologists, virologists, clinicians and regulators to develop novel medical therapies. In 2010 she performed gene therapy on a child with beta thalassemia. Children who are born with Thalassemia Major often develop anaemia within their first years of life. Cavazzana went on to provide gene therapy to sickle cell disease in 2014 and the first patient with Wiskott–Aldrich syndrome. Wiskott–Aldrich syndrome is an immunodeficiency associated with microthrombocytopenia. The child with sickle cell disease had a restored clinical and biological phenotype within sixth months of the gene therapy.

In 2017 Cavazzana was involved in re-writing the French bioethics laws, in particular, Law 2011–814. The law requires close family members to be informed when individuals are at risk of developing a genetically transmitted illness.

== Awards and honours ==
- 2006 : Prix de Recherche, clinique et thérapeutique
- 2012 : Prix Irène-Joliot-Curie de la Femme scientifique de l'année
- 2016 : Prize of l'Académie nationale de médecine
- 2017 : Fondation pour la recherche médicale Fondation Guillaume-Piel Award
- 2017 : American Society of Hematology Ernest Beutler Lecture and Prize for Clinical Science
- 2019 : University of Zurich Honorary Doctorate
- 2019 : Elected to the National Academy of Medicine
