= Hakima Mendil-Jakani =

French physical chemist

- Education: Pierre and Marie Curie University; ESPCI Paris; Paris-Sud University
- Awards: Irène Joliot-Curie Prize – Young Female Scientist Award; 2007
- Scientific career
- Fields: Chemistry
- Workplaces: French Alternative Energies and Atomic Energy Commission; CEA Grenoble
- Thesis: Identification of elastic terminal behavior in polymer melts, liquid crystal polymers and analysis of the phase transition induced by shear (2006)
- Doctoral advisor: Laurence Noirez

Hakima Mendil-Jakani is a French physical chemist and engineer specializing in soft condensed matter. In 2007, she won the Young Female Scientist Award of the Irène Joliot-Curie Prize.

== Biography ==
Mendil-Jakani earned a scientific baccalaureate with honors in 1997, and a university diploma of technology in physical measurements. During her final year internship in a French National Centre for Scientific Research (CNRS) fundamental research laboratory, she decided to expand her training by becoming an engineer. She joined the engineering school of the Institute of Science and Technology at the Pierre-et-Marie-Curie University. She then completed a diploma of advanced studies in chemistry and physical chemistry of polymers at the Higher School of Industrial Physics and Chemistry of the City of Paris (called ESPCI Paris). In 2006, she defended her PhD thesis in physics entitled Identification of elastic terminal behavior in polymer melts, liquid crystal polymers and analysis of the phase transition induced by shear, which she completed under the supervision of Laurence Noirez at the University of Paris-Sud.

Her research was conducted at the Léon Brillouin laboratory at the French Alternative Energies and Atomic Energy Commission in preparation for future work in research or for a position in the pharmaceutical industry.

In 2007, she joined the fundamental research department on condensed matter in the Ionic Polymer group at CEA Grenoble. She is part of the Synthesis, Structure and Properties of Functional Materials (STEP) laboratory of the Nanosciences and Cryogenics Institute (IAC).

She is a researcher affiliated with the Atomic Energy and Alternative Energies Commission, INAC Institute for Nanoscience, and works as a physical chemist of Soft Condensed Matter, including polymers and surfactants and radiation scattering techniques at large-scale facilities.

== Distinctions ==
- Women's Scientific and Technical Vocation Prize
- 2007: Irène-Joliot-Curie Prize in the young female scientist category
