= Béatrice Chatel =

French physicist, researcher

- Education: Institut d'optique
- Occupation: Physicist
- Known for: Femtosecond lasers

Béatrice Chatel is a French physicist and researcher specializing in femtosecond lasers. She was awarded an Irène Joliot-Curie Prize in 2005 for her work.

== Life and work ==
In 1993, Chatel graduated from the Institut d'optique Graduate School, sometimes called "SupOptique." She completed her thesis at the Kastler Brossel laboratory and then became a lecturer at the University Toulouse-III-Paul-Sabatier. After a short period at the Applied Optics Laboratory, she began full time research at the Collisions, Aggregates, Reactivity (LCAR) laboratory as a research fellow. Between 2013 and 2014, she was director of the laboratory.

Chatel distinguished herself by developing a laser capable of shaping its pulses in an extremely precise way. Using this tool, researchers can break up molecules in a controlled manner depending on the properties of the laser pulse to which they are subjected.

In addition to her work as a researcher, Chatel was president of the steering committee of the French National Centre for Scientific Research (CNRS) national network of femtosecond technologies, which seeks to promote exchanges among scientific communities that use these lasers. (A femtosecond laser is a beam of light that is sent in pulses that last about one quadrillionth of a second.) Chatel sometimes visits schools to share stories about her work with young people, "especially young girls." She has also worked as a volunteer at a hospital school where she "contrives to distract sick children with her physics lessons."

Chatel was part of the team that created a travelling optics exhibition that became a part of the World Year of Physics in 2005, the same year she was awarded the Irène Joliot-Curie Prize in the young scientist category.

== Selected publications ==
- Chatel, Béatrice, Jérôme Degert, Sabine Stock, and Bertrand Girard. "Competition between sequential and direct paths in a two-photon transition." Physical Review A 68, no. 4 (2003): 041402.
- Chatel, Béatrice, Jérôme Degert, and Bertrand Girard. "Role of quadratic and cubic spectral phases in ladder climbing with ultrashort pulses." Physical Review A 70, no. 5 (2004): 053414.
- Monmayrant, Antoine, Béatrice Chatel, and Bertrand Girard. "Real time quantum state holography using coherent transients." Optics communications 264, no. 2 (2006): 256-263.
- Chatel, Béatrice, Damien Bigourd, Sébastien Weber, and Bertrand Girard. "Coherent control of spin–orbit precession with shaped laser pulses." Journal of Physics B: Atomic, Molecular and Optical Physics 41, no. 7 (2008): 074023.
- Monmayrant, Antoine, Sébastien Weber, and Béatrice Chatel. "A newcomer's guide to ultrashort pulse shaping and characterization." Journal of Physics B: Atomic, Molecular and Optical Physics 43, no. 10 (2010): 103001.

== Distinctions ==
- 2005: Bronze Medal, CNRS
- 2005: Irène Joliot-Curie Prize, young scientist category.
