= Odile Hembise Fanton d'Andon =

French CEO of ACRI-ST

Odile Hembise Fanton d’Andon
- Education: University of Nice - Sophia Antipolis; Ecole des Mines de Paris; Pierre and Marie Curie University
- Occupations: Environmental researcher, CEO of ACRI-ST
- Known for: ACRI-ST; Irène Joliot-Curie Prize

Odile Hembise Fanton d’Andon is a French environmental researcher, and co-founder and CEO of the company ACRI-ST, which leads an International consortium of independent organizations working together to better understand and monitor the Earth's environment. Fanton d’Andon was the recipient of the Irène Joliot-Curie Prize in the category "Women, Research and Enterprise" in 2021 for her work.

== Life and work ==
Fanton d'Andon earned a Master's degree in Applied Mathematics from the University of Nice - Sophia Antipolis, a DEA from the Ecole des Mines de Paris, and a Doctorate from Sorbonne University (Paris VI).

The work of Fanton d'Andon has focused on methods and products derived from combinations of satellite observation, atmospheric chemistry and climatology. She co-founded the French company ACRI in 1989 to create a way to bring together experts in the fields of mathematics, physics and fluid dynamics and collectively gain a better understanding of the Earth's environment. The company specializes in remote sensing from space, transforming the collected data transmitted by satellites into information, and integrating that knowledge in research using the processing and interpretation tools developed by the company.

In 2000, she co-founded and became CEO of ACRI-ST, the operating company of ACRI. ACRI-ST leads an international group of eight independent organizations in seven countries, which combine the talents of their 150 researchers and engineers. The operational companies secure, improve and deliver quality data and insights for understanding climate change, the environment and the universe to make informed decisions.

== Awards and distinctions ==
- 2015: Etoiles de l'Europe (Stars of Europe) Prize from the French Ministry of Education and Research to "coordinators of particularly successful EU-funded research projects led from France."
- 2021: Irène Joliot-Curie Prize in the category "Women, Research and Enterprise."
- 2023: Knighted in the order of the Legion of Honour (French Ministry of the Economy, Finance and Industrial and Digital Sovereignty)≤https://www.legifrance.gouv.fr/jorf/id/JORFTEXT000047826002≥

== Selected publications ==
Her work is published under several names including: Fanton d'Andon, O.H.; d'Andon O.H.; Hembise Fanton d'Andon, O.; Odile Hembise Fanton Dandon.

- Lavender, S., Fanton d'Andon, O. H., Emsley, S., Bourg, L., Nightingale, T., North, P., ... & Goryl, P. (2010, December). Products Definition and Determining Uncertainties; Sentinel-3 Optical Level 2 Prototype Processor. In ESA Living Planet Symposium (Vol. 686, p. 210).
- Lavender, S. J., & Fanton dAndon, H. (2010). The challenge of determining uncertainties for optical remote sensing products; Sentinel-3 Optical Level 2 Prototype Processor. In Proceedings from the 2010 AGU Ocean Sciences Meeting. American Geophysical Union, 2000 Florida Ave., N. W. Washington D.C. 20009 USA.
- Serra, R., Mangin, A., Fanton d'Andon, O. H., Lauters, F., Thomasset, F., & Martin-Lauzer, F. R. (2016, August). Biological Status Monitoring of European Fresh Water with Sentinel-2. In Living Planet Symposium (Vol. 740, p. 250).
- Werdell PJ, Franz BA, Bailey SW, Feldman GC, Boss E, Brando VE, Dowell M, Hirata T, Lavender SJ, Lee Z, Loisel H, Maritorena S, Mélin F, Moore TS, Smyth TJ, Antoine D, Devred E, d'Andon OH, Mangin A. Generalized ocean color inversion model for retrieving marine inherent optical properties. Appl Opt. 2013 Apr 1;52(10):2019-37. doi:10.1364/AO.52.002019. PMID 23545956.
- Garnesson, P., Mangin, A., Demaria, J., Bretagnon, M., & Hembise Fanton d'Andon, O. (2021, April). First release of the CMEMS Global coastal OLCI 300 meters Chlorophyll-a Product. In EGU General Assembly Conference Abstracts (pp. EGU21-6239).
- d’Andon, O. H. F., Mangin, A., Maritorena, S., Lavender, S., Antoine, D., Morel, A., & Pinnock, S., Exploitation of Globcolour Dataset: Global Characterisation of Chlorophyll, ACDM and BHP Uncertanties [sic] at Pixel Level.
