= Muriel Thomasset =

French physicist (born 1971)

- Born: Muriel Pichet; 1971 (age 54–55)
- Education: Pierre and Marie Curie University
- Occupation: Physicist specializing in optics
- Known for: Irène Joliot-Curie Prize

Muriel Thomasset (born 1971), is a French physicist who specializes in optics. In 2003, she received an Irène Joliot-Curie Prize.

== Life and work ==
Thomasset earned her master's degree in optics and photonics and in 1998 she defended her doctoral thesis in physics with her thesis titled High spatial resolution imaging in the X-UV domain using Fresnel zone lenses" under the supervision of Pierre Dhez at the Pierre and Marie Curie University.

In 1998, she joined the private sector as head of a design office specializing in fiber optic lighting, but in 2000 she returned to public research and joined the French National Centre for Scientific Research (CNRS), at the LURE laboratory, the predecessor of the SOLEIL synchrotron, a type of particle accelerator.

Thomasset continues her work at the SOLEIL synchrotron and manages the Optical Group Metrology Laboratory (LMO) located in the Synchrotron building. The synchrotron is capable of producing and supplying an extremely intense beam of light, and is useful for designing experiments in all scientific disciplines ranging from biology to fundamental physics. Her responsibilities include the design of measurement systems and setting up inspections and acceptances of optical elements, such as mirrors or diffraction gratings, that are necessary for focusing the light beam from the synchrotron.

== Awards and distinctions ==
- 2003: Irène-Joliot-Curie prize in the category Woman in Business and Technology for promoting scientific careers for women.

== Selected publications ==
- Thomasset, M., Brochet, S., & Polack, F. (2005, September). Latest metrology results with the SOLEIL synchrotron LTP. In Advances in Metrology for X-Ray and EUV Optics (Vol. 5921, pp. 12–20). SPIE.
- Rommeveaux, A., Thomasset, M., & Cocco, D. (2008). The long trace profilers. In Modern Developments in X-ray and Neutron Optics (pp. 181–191). Springer, Berlin, Heidelberg.
- Polack, F., Thomasset, M., Brochet, S., & Rommeveaux, A. (2010). An LTP stitching procedure with compensation of instrument errors: Comparison of SOLEIL and ESRF results on strongly curved mirrors. Nuclear Instruments and Methods in Physics Research Section A: Accelerators, Spectrometers, Detectors and Associated Equipment, 616(2–3), 207–211.
- Thomasset, M., Fernandez-Manjarrés, J. F., Douglas, G. C., Frascaria-Lacoste, N., Raquin, C., & Hodkinson, T. R. (2011). Molecular and morphological characterization of reciprocal F1 hybrid ash (Fraxinus excelsior× Fraxinus angustifolia, Oleaceae) and parental species reveals asymmetric character inheritance. International Journal of Plant Sciences, 172(3), 423–433.
- Thomasset, M., Idir, M., Polack, F., Bray, M., & Servant, J. J. (2013). A new phase-shift microscope designed for high accuracy stitching interferometry. Nuclear Instruments and Methods in Physics Research Section A: Accelerators, Spectrometers, Detectors and Associated Equipment, 710, 7–12.
