= Nathalie Palanque-Delabrouille =

French cosmologist (born 1970)

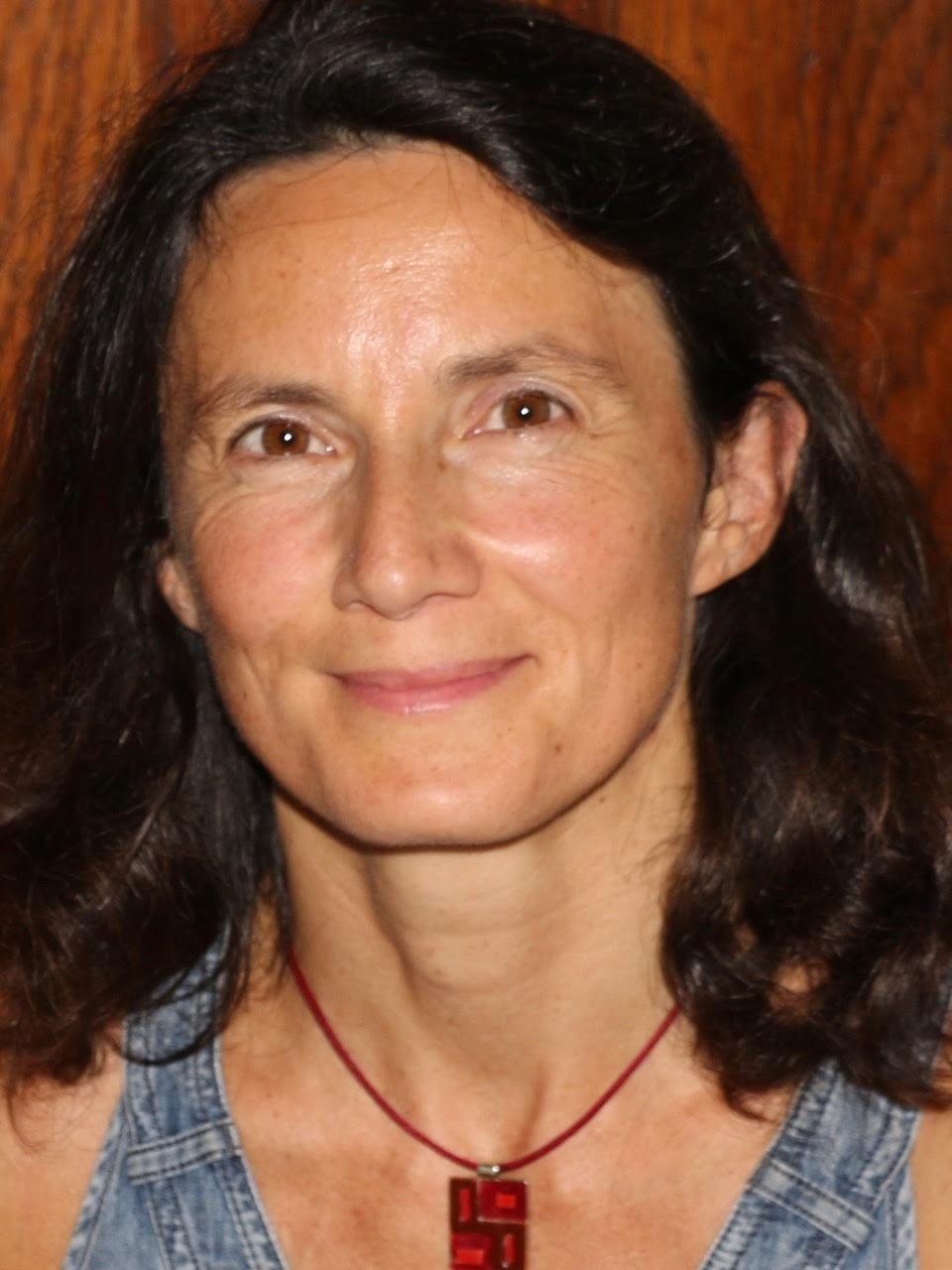
- Born: Nathalie Palanque
- Education: Télécom Paris; University of Chicago
- Occupation: Cosmologist
- Known for: Irène Joliot-Curie Prize, Knight of the Legion of Honor
- Spouse: Jacques Delabrouille
- Children: Three

Nathalie Palanque-Delabrouille, (born, 31 October 1970 in Ermont), is a French cosmologist. During her career as a researcher in particle physics, she has taken part in several large-scale experiments. Her work has been recognized several times including the Irène Joliot-Curie Prize, the appointment as Knight of the Legion of Honor and her election to the French Academy of Sciences.

== Biography ==
Born in 1970, Palanque-Delabrouille earned an engineering degree from Télécom Paris in 1992 and became a research assistant in the physics department at the University of Chicago. The following year, she became a research assistant in the department of astronomy and astrophysics at the same university. In 1997, Palanque-Delabrouille defended her doctoral thesis Research on galactic dark matter by gravitational microlensing effect in joint supervision between the University of Chicago and the Paris Diderot University, directed by David Schramm and E. Aubourg. In the same year, she obtained a permanent research position at the Institute for research into the fundamental laws of the universe at CEA Saclay (Saclay Nuclear Research Center).

From 2002 to 2011, Palanque-Delabrouille participated in the corrections of the physics tests for the entrance examination to the École Polytechnique. In 2008, she worked with astrophysicist Hubert Reeves on the book Little history of matter and the universe. In 2009 she was appointed senior expert at the CEA in astroparticles and cosmology, and then, in 2014, was named director of research at the CEA.

Her work focuses on dark matter and dark energy, which are considered the main unexplained components of the universe. According to the French National Academy of Sciences,

She contributed to disproving the existence of dark stars to explain the dark matter of our Galaxy, led the first studies of underwater sites for the deployment of a neutrino detector, analyzed stellar explosions, mapped the Cosmos and developed colossal simulations of our Universe to solve the mystery of its accelerating expansion.

In 2011, she co-authored with her husband Jacques Delabrouille, Les nouveaux messagers du cosmos (The new messengers of the Cosmos). During the year 2013-2014, she became visiting researcher at the Lawrence Berkeley National Laboratory in Berkeley, California. She became director of the Physics Division of LBNL in 2021.

Nathalie Palanque-Delabrouille is the mother of three children, and she lives in the Ile-de-France region.

== Awards and distinctions ==
- 1992: Lavoisier Prize from the French Ministry of Foreign Affairs
- 1993: Prize of Excellence in Teaching of Undergraduates, University of Chicago
- 1997: Saint-Gobain Prize from the French Physical Society for the two best theses of the year
- 2010: Thibaud Prize from the Academy of Sciences, Belles-Lettres and Arts of Lyon
- 2012: Astronomy book prize for the book The new messengers of the cosmos
- 2017: Irène Joliot-Curie Prize in the Female Scientist of the Year category
- 2018: Knight of the Legion of Honor
- 2020: Election to the French Academy of Sciences

== Positions of responsibility ==
Nathalie Palanque-Delabrouille has held important responsibilities in major international projects since 1994:

- 1994-2003: Dark Object Search Experiment (EROS), search for dark matter using microlenses (in the direction of the two Magellanic clouds );
- 1998-2004: Antares (Astronomy with a Neutrino Telescope and Abyss environmental Research), astrophysics with high-energy neutrinos ;
- 2003-2013: SuperNova Legacy Survey (SNLS, cosmology with supernovae ;
- Since 2010: Sloan Digital Sky Survey (SDSS), Dark Energy Spectroscopic Instrument (DESI), cosmology focusing on large-scale structures. Ombudsperson for DESI from 2015 to 2018, head of the DESI Lyman-α working group in 2017 and 2018, head of the target selection working groups for SDSS since 2012 and for DESI from 2014 to 2017. International co-spokesperson for DESI 2018 to 2024.

== Selected publications ==
- Palanque-Delabrouille, Nathalie, and Jacques Delabrouille. Les nouveaux messagers du cosmos. Paris: Éd. du Seuil. (2011).
- Palanque-Delabrouille, Nathalie, Christophe Yèche, Arnaud Borde, Jean-Marc Le Goff, Graziano Rossi, Matteo Viel, Éric Aubourg et al. "The one-dimensional Lyα forest power spectrum from BOSS." Astronomy & Astrophysics 559 (2013): A85.
- Palanque-Delabrouille, Nathalie, Christophe Yeche, Julien Baur, Christophe Magneville, Graziano Rossi, Julien Lesgourgues, Arnaud Borde et al. "Neutrino masses and cosmology with Lyman-alpha forest power spectrum." Journal of Cosmology and Astroparticle Physics 2015, no. 11 (2015): 011.
- Palanque-Delabrouille, Nathalie, Christophe Yèche, Julien Lesgourgues, Graziano Rossi, Arnaud Borde, Matteo Viel, Eric Aubourg et al. "Constraint on neutrino masses from SDSS-III/BOSS Lyα forest and other cosmological probes." Journal of Cosmology and Astroparticle Physics 2015, no. 02 (2015): 045.
- Baur, Julien, Nathalie Palanque-Delabrouille, Christophe Yèche, Christophe Magneville, and Matteo Viel. "Lyman-alpha forests cool warm dark matter." Journal of Cosmology and Astroparticle Physics 2016, no. 08 (2016): 012.
- Reeves, Hubert, Michel Cassé, Étienne Klein, Marc Lachièze-Rey, Roland Lehoucq, Jean-Pierre Luminet, Nathalie Palanque-Delabrouille, Nicolas Prantzos, and Sylvie Vauclair. Petite histoire de la matière et de l'univers. (2019)
- Palanque-Delabrouille, Nathalie, Christophe Yèche, Nils Schöneberg, Julien Lesgourgues, Michael Walther, Solène Chabanier, and Eric Armengaud. "Hints, neutrino bounds, and WDM constraints from SDSS DR14 Lyman-α and Planck full-survey data." Journal of Cosmology and Astroparticle Physics 2020, no. 04 (2020): 038.
