= Hélène Olivier-Bourbigou =

French chemist (born 1962)

- Born: Hélène Olivier; 9 March 1962 (age 64); Toulouse, France
- Education: Rennes National School of Chemistry; Pierre and Marie Curie University; University of Sussex
- Occupations: Chemist, researcher
- Known for: Irène Joliot-Curie Prize

Hélène Olivier-Bourbigou (born 9 March 1962 in Toulouse), is a French chemist. She is a research fellow in the field of homogeneous molecular catalysis at IFP Énergies Nouvelle, and her work aims to develop homogeneous catalytic processes that are more respectful of the environment. She received the Irène Joliot-Curie Prize in 2014 in the category "Female Scientist of the Year."

== Life and work ==
Olivier-Bourbigou completed her engineering degree in 1985 at the National School of Chemistry in Rennes and went on to finish her doctorate in 1988 at Université Paris VI under the supervision of Yves Chauvin (winner of the Nobel Prize in Chemistry in 2005). She carried out her post-doctoral research at the University of Sussex in the United Kingdom where she worked with Michael Lappert, Fellow of the Royal Society. She earned her habilitation in 2003 at Université Paris VI (formerly known as Pierre and Marie Curie University).

She joined IFP Énergies nouvelles in 1989 and, since 2002, she has been director of the molecular catalysis department at IFP Lyon. She has been authorized to direct research at the University of Paris VI since 2005. In 2013, she was elected president of the catalysis division of the Chemical Society of France.

According to IFP Energies Nouvelle,

Catalysts are substances that accelerate chemical reactions and direct their selectivity. They are used in processes for transforming raw materials (of petroleum or vegetable origin) into molecules with higher added value for the production of plastics, polymers, etc. ... [The work of Olivier-Bourbigou] aims to develop more efficient catalysts, for a more sustainable and economically competitive chemistry and which has led to major scientific advances in catalysis.

In 2018, Olivier-Bourbigou was elected to the French Academy of Technologies.

== Awards and distinctions ==
- 2021: Grand Prize Pierre Süe awarded by the Chemical Society of France
- 2021: Applied Catalysis Award, given every two years by the European Federation of Catalysis Communities
- 2015: Knight, the Legion of Honor
- 2014: Irène Joliot-Curie Prize “Female Scientist of the Year”
- 2006: Knight in the National Order of Merit
- 1999: Montgolfier award presented by the National Industry Encouragement Society
- 1997: Prize of the Catalysis Division of the SFC

== Selected publications ==
She has authored many works published in journals and book chapters and at least 98 patents.

- Olivier-Bourbigou, H., & Magna, L. (2002). Ionic liquids: perspectives for organic and catalytic reactions. Journal of Molecular Catalysis A: Chemical, 182, 419-437.
- Thomazeau, C., Olivier-Bourbigou, H., Magna, L., Luts, S., & Gilbert, B. (2003). Determination of an acidic scale in room temperature ionic liquids. Journal of the American Chemical Society, 125(18), 5264-5265.
- Olivier-Bourbigou, H., Magna, L., & Morvan, D. (2010). Ionic liquids and catalysis: Recent progress from knowledge to applications. Applied Catalysis A: General, 373(1-2), 1-56.
- Olivier-Bourbigou, H., Breuil, P. A. R., Magna, L., Michel, T., Espada Pastor, M. F., & Delcroix, D. (2020). Nickel catalyzed olefin oligomerization and dimerization. Chemical Reviews, 120(15), 7919-7983.
