= Julie Grollier =

French physicist

- Born: 1975 (age 50–51); Poitiers
- Education: Supélec; University of Caen Normandy; École normale supérieure Université Pierre et Marie Curie (PhD)
- Scientific career
- Fields: spintronics, magnetic storage
- Workplaces: CNRS/Thales
- Thesis: Renversement d'aimantation par injection d'un courant polarisé en spin (2003)
- Doctoral advisor: Albert Fert

Julie Grollier is a French physicist working in the field of spintronics. She won the Irène Joliot-Curie Prize from the French Academy of Sciences in 2021.

== Education and career ==
Grollier studied at the French engineering school Supélec, before doing an internship in the Laboratory of Crystallography and Materials Science at the University of Caen Normandy. She then conducted her doctoral research at École normale supérieure Paris-Saclay under the supervision of Nobel Prize laureate Albert Fert, working on magnetization reversal by the injection of spin-current injection. She later joined the University of Groningen in the Netherlands and then the Centre for Nanosciences and Nanotechnologies (formerly known as Institut d'électronique fondamentale, in France), as a postdoctoral fellow working on the magnetization dynamics of nano-magnets. She joined the joint research unit CNRS/Thales in 2005.

== Recognition ==
Grollier was awarded the CNRS Silver Medal in 2018, and the Irène Joliot-Curie Prize from the French Academy of Sciences in 2021.

In 2015, she was named a Fellow of the American Physical Society (APS), after a nomination from the APS Topical Group on Magnetism and its Applications, "for measurements of spin-transfer torque dynamics and the development of devices to implement biologically inspired computing".
