= Hélène Morlon =

French mathematician, ecologist

- Born: 1978 (age 47–48)
- Education: École Normale Supérieure Paris-Saclay; Pierre-et-Marie-Curie University
- Occupations: Mathematician, ecologist
- Known for: Tree of life software tool

Hélène Morlon, born in 1978, is a French mathematician and ecologist specializing in biodiversity computational modeling, identifying the factors that influence the diversification of species and their phenotypic evolution over millions of years. For her work, she was awarded an Irène Joliot-Curie Prize in 2017.

== Biography ==
In 1995, Hélène Morlon began studying mathematics and physics at the Thiers high school in Marseille. In 1997, she joined the École Normale Supérieure Paris-Saclay in mathematics and obtained the agrégation in 2000. In 2001, she obtained her DEA in ecology at the Pierre-et-Marie-Curie University and the École Normale Supérieure (ENS). From 2001 to 2005, she completed a thesis in ecotoxicology at Bordeaux-I University under the supervision of Alain Boudou and Jacqueline Garnier-Laplace. In 2014, she was authorized to direct research by the École Normale Supérieure.

=== Career ===
In 2006, Morlon moved to the United States, where she carried out her postdoctoral research. From 2006 to 2007, she worked at the University of California, Merced with engineer Jessica Green. In 2007, she relocated to continue working with Green at the University of Oregon in the laboratory of Brendan Bohannan. In 2009, she worked with Joshua Plotkin at the University of Pennsylvania, and in 2010, she carried out research with Matthew Potts at the University of California, Berkeley.

On her return to France in 2010, Morlon was recruited by the National Center for Scientific Research (CNRS) and continued her research at the applied mathematics center of the École Polytechnique. There, she was granted funding from the National Research Agency, Chair of Excellence, and trained a team of young researchers. In June 2011, she became an associate member of the Interdisciplinary Center for Research in Biology at the Collège de France. In September 2013, she was appointed assistant professor at the University of Arizona. In 2014, she joined the ENS Institute of Biology and obtained a consolidator grant from the European Research Council.

Morlon is an editor for three academic journals (PloS Biology, Ecology Letters and Systematic Biology) and a reviewer for other major publications.

=== Tree of Life tool ===
Morlon has also been involved in the development of an online visualization tool demonstrating the tree of life called “onezoom,” which is an interactive map that displays evolutionary connections among many living organisms and highlights species at risk of extinction.

== Distinctions and awards ==
- National Center for Scientific Research bronze medal (2015)
- Irène Joliot-Curie Prize in the “Young Woman Scientist” category for her work on modeling biodiversity, at the crossroads of mathematics and ecology (2017)
- National Center for Scientific Research silver medal (2021)
- Chevalier of the National Order of Merit (2021)
