= Sophie Postel-Vinay =

French researcher, oncologist

- Education: University René Descartes; Institute of Cancer Research, London
- Occupations: researcher, oncologist
- Known for: Irène Joliot-Curie Prize

Sophie Postel-Vinay is a French physician and scientist at the Institut Gustave Roussy where she has led an ATIP-Avenir team since 2018. She works on oncology and the development of new drugs and is an expert in early clinical trials. She was the 2019 winner of the Irène Joliot-Curie Prize in the “young woman scientist” category.

== Biography ==
Postel-Vinay earned her medical degree from the University René Descartes Paris V in 2010. As member of Olivier Delattre's team at the Institut Curie, she contributed to important human genetic work on Ewing's sarcoma, which led to the identification of loci associated with the risk of developing this pediatric tumor (published in the journal Nature Genetics in 2012). After her internship, she did a PhD thesis at the Institute of Cancer Research, London, as part of the team of Alan Ashworth, focusing on DNA repair and synthetic lethality. She completed her post-doctoral fellowship in Paris and spent 18 months at the Royal Marsden Hospital in London in Professor Stanley Kaye's drug development unit.

She defended her dissertation, titled Synthetic lethality and functional study of DNA repair defects in ERCC1-deficient non-small-cell lung cancer, in December 2016. Her research was directed by Fabrice André and Postel-Vinay received an ESMO Translational Research Fellowship for her dissertation.

Head of clinic in the Department of Therapeutic Innovation and Early Trials (DITEP) of the Gustave-Roussy Institute, for two years, she is a doctor-researcher in the drug development department and at the INSERM U981 research unit at the same institute where, since January 2018, she has directed an independent research group.

Postel-Vinay is an expert on early clinical trials. Her research activity focuses on chromatin remodeling and its interaction with DNA damage repair and immune modulation in solid tumor cancer models. Her research interests include DNA repair and chromatin remodeling, synthetic lethality, sarcoma, drug development, predictive biomarkers and novel targets.

She is an expert on early clinical trials and a member of the American Association for Cancer Research AACR and the American Society of Clinical Oncology (ASCO), from which she received an award of merit in 2010. She is also a member of the European Society of Medical Oncology (ESMO), was a representative of young French oncologists on the ESMO Young Oncologists Committee (YOC) from 2013 to 2016.

== Distinctions ==
- Sisters Lucie and Olga Fradiss prize from the Fondation de France in recognition of her work.
- Irène Joliot-Curie Prize in the category, young woman scientist, 2019 "for her research work on the early development of new molecules, in particular on the therapeutic targeting of DNA repair defects. and chromatin remodeling in cancer."
