= Marie-Paule Cani =

French computer scientist and academic (born 1965)

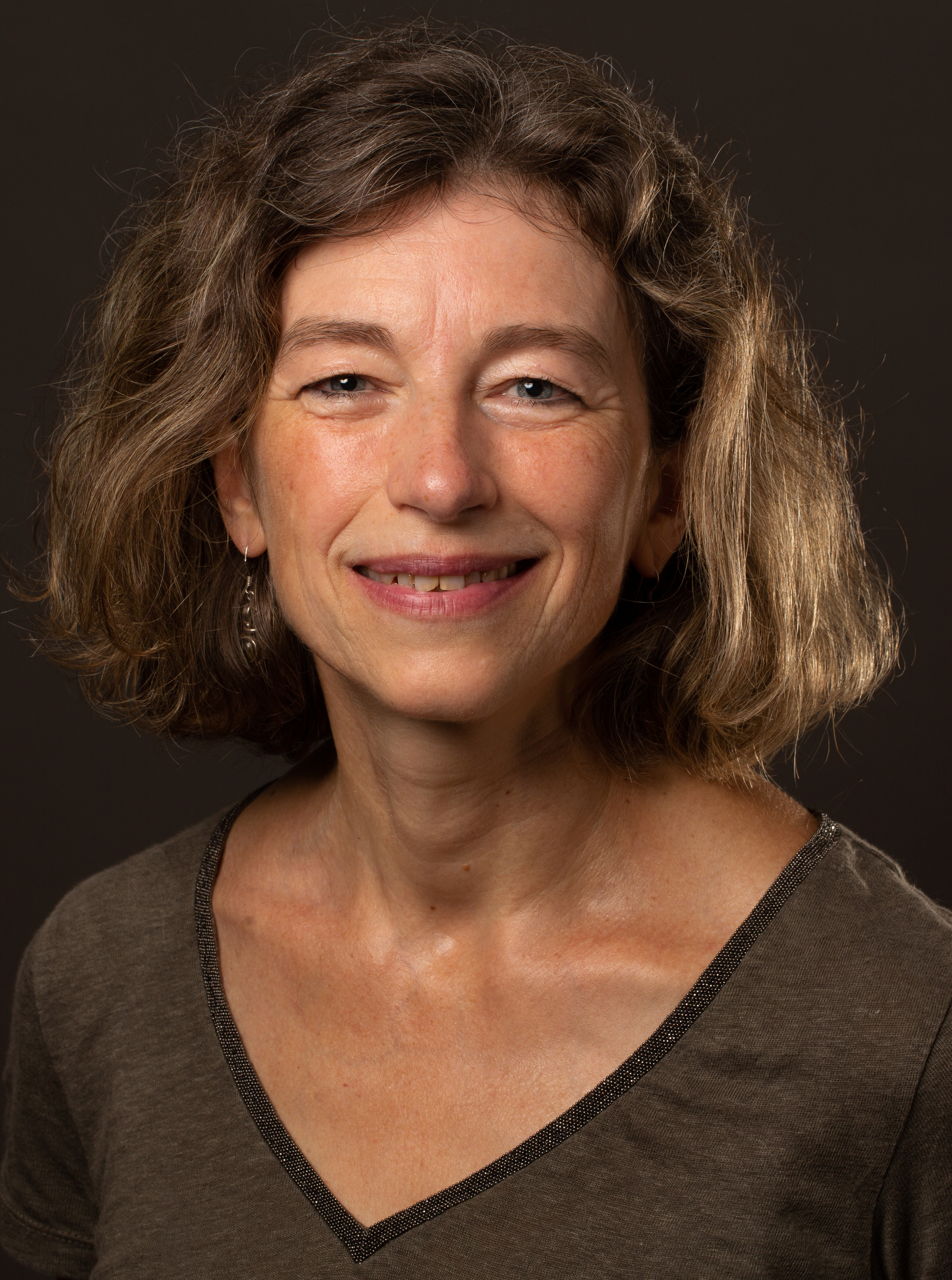
- Born: 1965 (age 60–61)
- Occupation: Professor of computer science

Marie-Paule Cani (born 1965) is a French computer scientist and researcher specializing in shape modeling and computer animation. Her work primarily addresses the use of implicit surfaces in graphic modeling, physics-based 3D animation, interactive tools for expressive modeling, and the design of virtual worlds for scientific research.

Cani is currently a professor at the École Polytechnique within the LIX laboratory, and a member of the French Academy of Sciences. Throughout her career, she has made significant contributions to computer graphics, for which she has been recognized with the ACM SIGGRAPH Steven A. Coons Award and the Eurographics Gold Medal.

== Education and academic career ==
Cani completed her M.Sc. in Computer Science at the École Normale Supérieure (ENS) and University Paris XI in 1987. She subsequently earned her Ph.D. in Computer Graphics from University Paris XI in 1990 under the supervision of Claude Puech, followed by her habilitation from Institut National Polytechnique de Grenoble (Grenoble INP) in 1995.

She began her academic career as a lecturer at ENS in Paris (1990–1993) before moving to Grenoble INP as an assistant professor. She was promoted to full professor in 1997. During her time in Grenoble, she founded and led the EVASION and IMAGINE research teams at INRIA, focusing on modeling, simulation, and learning.

For the 2014–2015 academic year, she was appointed to the annual chair of Informatics and Computational Sciences at the Collège de France. Since May 2017, she has been a professor of computer science at the École Polytechnique (Paris-Saclay).

Beyond her teaching and research, Cani has been actively involved in academic leadership. She served on the executive committee of ACM SIGGRAPH (2008–2011) and its Publication Board (2011–2014). Within the Eurographics Association, she served as vice-president (2013–2016) before being elected president for the 2017–2018 term.

== Research ==
Cani's research philosophy aims to develop user-centered, creative 3D modeling and animation systems. Her goal is to create intelligent tools that allow artists, scientists, and the general public to express complex shapes in motion seamlessly. She has published extensively and contributed to several specific areas:

=== Uses of implicit surfaces ===
Her early work focuses on the use of implicit surfaces for modeling and animation. Implicit surfaces allow for the precise calculation of contact surfaces between deformable objects while remaining computationally efficient. She extends the use of this mathematical approach to the representation of soft substances (pastes, viscous fluids) capable of separating and merging.

=== 3D animation derived from the simulation of physical laws ===
The animation algorithms developed by her teams rely on a simplified simulation of physical laws, enabling a balance between plausibility and control. One of her early projects at EVASION focused on animating lava flows, taking into account the material's viscosity and temperature variations. Subsequent work has addressed the animation of everything from entire landscapes to groups of elements as fine as individual strands of hair, leading to collaborations with major industry players such as Pixar, Ubisoft, and Disney Research.

=== Multi-layer animation models ===
Animating complex natural scenes involves the use of multi-layer models, each representing a specific aspect of the phenomenon being simulated. In her approach, these may rely on completely different mechanisms operating at distinct temporal and spatial scales, all combined over time. This allows, for instance, for the representation of an ocean where wave-induced deformations accumulate and fade into the distance.

=== "Expressive" interactive modeling tools ===
With a lifelong passion for drawing and sculpture, Cani develops modeling tools inspired by real-world techniques, facilitating the transition from a sketch to a 3D representation. Her creative tools, like the WorldBrush software developed with the IMAGINE team, utilize machine learning combined with expert systems, aiming to amplify rather than replace human creativity.

=== Virtual worlds for scientific research ===
Combining these techniques and collaborating with specialists in relevant fields, she engineers virtual worlds designed to test or explore scientific hypotheses. One of her notable projects involves simulating a prehistoric ecosystem in collaboration with paleontologists and geologists.

== Awards and honors ==
Cani's contributions to computer science and her efforts to support women in STEM have been widely recognized:

- 2007: Awarded the national Irène Joliot-Curie Prize (Mentorship category) for her dedication to mentoring women in computer science.
- 2011: Received the Eurographics Outstanding Technical Contributions Award.
- 2013: Elected as a member of Academia Europaea.
- 2019: Inducted into the ACM SIGGRAPH Academy and elected as a member of the French Academy of Sciences.
- 2021: Appointed as a Commander of the Ordre national du Mérite by the French Republic.
- 2022: Received the Distinguished Career Award from the Eurographics Association and the Tosiyasu Kunii Achievement Award from Shape Modeling International.
- 2023: Honored with the ACM SIGGRAPH Steven A. Coons Award for outstanding contributions to computer graphics.
- 2024: Promoted to the rank of Officer (Officier) in the Legion of Honour (Légion d'honneur).
- 2025: Awarded the Eurographics Gold Medal.
