= Travail, Genre et Sociétés =

- Discipline: Women's studies
- Language: English, French
- Edited by: Margaret Maruani

Publication details
- History: 1999–present
- Publisher: La Découverte
- Frequency: Biannually

Standard abbreviations
- ISO 4: Trav. Genre Soc.

Indexing
- ISSN: 1294-6303
- LCCN: 2005204770
- OCLC no.: 473679947

Links
- Journal homepage; Online archive

Travail, Genre et Sociétés (English: Work, gender and societies) is a biannual French language peer-reviewed academic journal which studies the differences between men and women in the workplace and, more broadly, the role of women in society. The editor-in-chief is Margaret Maruani (CNRS and Paris Descartes University).

== Abstracting and indexing ==
The journal is abstracted and indexed in the Social Sciences Citation Index and Scopus.

== See also ==
- List of women's studies journals
