= Sylvaine Neveu =

French chemist (born 1968)

- Born: 6 January 1968 (age 58); Rennes, France
- Education: ParisTech School of Chemistry; École Nationale Supérieure des mines
- Occupation: Silica chemist
- Known for: Irène Joliot-Curie Prize

Sylvaine Neveu, born on 6 January 1968, is a French chemist and scientific director of the Solvay group. She received an Irène-Joliot-Curie Prize in 2016.

== Life and work ==
Born in Rennes, France, Neveu attended Châteaubriand high school before enrolling at the ParisTech School of Chemistry. She went on to earn her doctorate in process engineering from the École Nationale Supérieure des mines in Paris and joined the Belgian company Solvay group in 1994. There, she is works at the Research and Innovation organization in charge of the development of products and processes for the Group's Global Business Unit Silica.

All of Neveu's work is based on understanding the "nanoscopic structure and functions of an important molecule in a number of everyday objects, silica or quartz, which is none other than silicon dioxide (SiO2)."

She received the Irène-Joliot-Curie prize in 2016 for her innovations in the field of silica and energy-saving tires. During an interview with Sergeant, she described her tire project.

Thus, the new "green tire" requires less energy to manufacture than its rubber ancestors. The material that makes up the tire, a synthetic polymer containing 50% silica, brings 10 to 20% technical improvements: it wears out less quickly and adheres better to the road, thus contributing to better safety.

Her research projects target the reduction of the consumption of energy and water during the production of silicas, and she has "authored 17 patent families and leads the department in charge of the development and industrialization of new silica products and processes."

== Awards and distinctions ==
- Irène-Joliot-Curie prize in the category "Research and Business Woman" in 2016.
