= Bénédicte Menez =

French geomicrobiologist

- Menez in 2019
- Education: Paris Diderot University
- Occupations: Geomicrobiologist, Institute of Earth Physics in Paris
- Known for: Irène Joliot-Curie Prize

Bénédicte Menez is a French geomicrobiologist and university professor in Earth Sciences at the Institut de Physique du Globe de Paris. In 2012, she received the Irène Joliot-Curie Prize in the “Young Female Scientist” category for her work.

== Life and work ==
Bénédicte Menez earned both her doctorate in 1999 and her habilitation in 2009 at Paris Diderot University, also known as University of Paris 7.

Menez leads the Current and Primitive Geobiosphere team at the Institute of Earth Physics in Paris, where her group has integrated results from spectroscopy, microscopy, microbiology and geochemistry to study interactions between microorganisms and rocks that she characterizes using microimaging and spectroscopy techniques. Since 2001, she has been developing strategies to study the deep biosphere, the intraterrestrial life that develops in the depths of the Earth's crust.

Specifically, Menez has used synchrotron imaging to obtain results concerning the reaction between bacteria and geological storage of carbon dioxide (CO_{2}). She has shown that the impact of biomass pro-based on CO_{2} storage could be modulated by the cell death induced by the precipitation of solid carbonate.

By studying the deep ecosystems found in peridotites, rocks of the oceanic lithosphere, she has been able to highlight the presence of microbial niches in environments where their presence and their impact on the Earth's chemistry had not been demonstrated before. The altered peridotites reside on very thick strata of endogenous organic carbon of biological origin. This active and varied intraterrestrial life "contains a considerable biomass and is thus a major component of our planet" and allows fundamental research on the origin of the life. Also, because of its applied aspects, "it has potential in the field of new energy technologies, including the storage of CO_{2}."

== Awards and distinctions ==
2008: Holweck, Grelaud and Guido-Triossi Prize awarded by the Academy of Sciences.

2012: Irène Joliot-Curie Prize, “Young Female Scientist” category.

== Selected publications ==
In publications, her name is spelled as Menez or Ménez.

- Menez, B., Philippot, P., Bonnin-Mosbah, M., Simionovici, A., & Gibert, F. (2002). Analysis of individual fluid inclusions using synchrotron X-ray fluorescence microprobe: progress toward calibration for trace elements. Geochimica et Cosmochimica Acta, 66(4), 561–576.
- Ménez, B., Pasini, V., & Brunelli, D. (2012). Life in the hydrated suboceanic mantle. Nature Geoscience, 5(2), 133–137.
- Trias, R., Ménez, B., le Campion, P., Zivanovic, Y., Lecourt, L., Lecoeuvre, A., ... & Gérard, E. (2017). High reactivity of deep biota under anthropogenic CO_{2} injection into basalt. Nature communications, 8(1), 1–14.
- Ménez, B., Pisapia, C., Andreani, M., Jamme, F., Vanbellingen, Q. P., Brunelle, A., ... & Réfrégiers, M. (2018). Abiotic synthesis of amino acids in the recesses of the oceanic lithosphere. Nature, 564(7734), 59–63.
- Ménez, B. (2020). Abiotic hydrogen and methane: Fuels for life. Elements: An International Magazine of Mineralogy, Geochemistry, and Petrology, 16(1), 39–46.
