= Gilles Boeuf =

French biologist

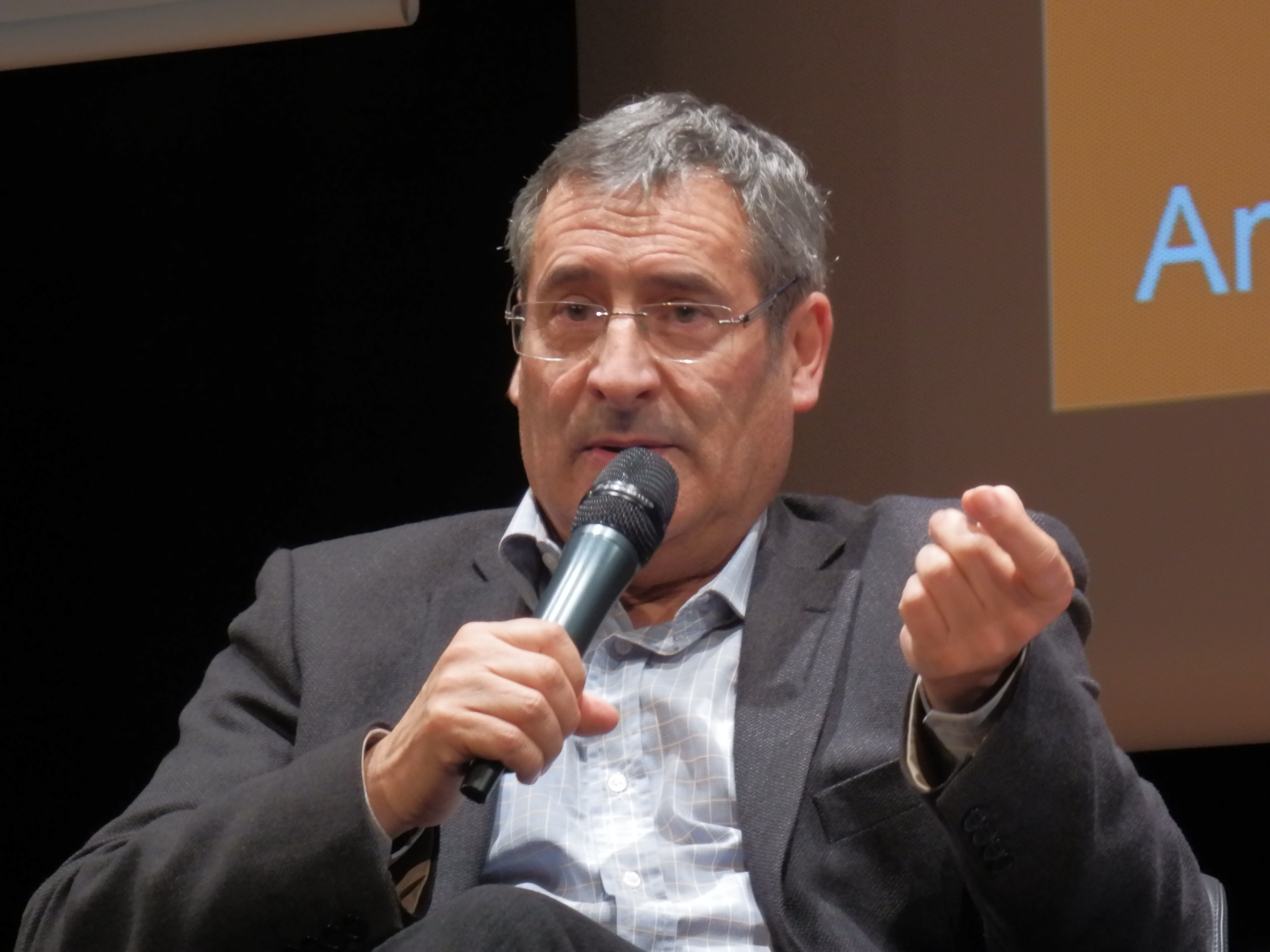
Gilles Boeuf at Espace-des-sciences, November 6, 2012

Gilles Boeuf (born November 6, 1950, in Paimbœuf) is a French biologist, who served as president of the National Museum of Natural History, France from February 2009 to August 2015. He was a professor at Pierre and Marie Curie University. He was knighted with the French Order of Merit in 2009, and the Legion of Honour in 2013.
