= Expert Opinion on Therapeutic Targets =

- Discipline: Pharmacology, therapeutics
- Language: English

Publication details
- Former name(s): Emerging Therapeutic Targets
- History: 1997–present
- Publisher: Informa (United Kingdom)
- Frequency: Monthly
- Impact factor: 4.598 (2017)

Standard abbreviations
- ISO 4: Expert Opin. Ther. Targets

Indexing
- ISSN: 1472-8222 (print); 1744-7631 (web)
- LCCN: 2002243135
- OCLC no.: 49275520

Links
- Journal homepage

Expert Opinion on Therapeutic Targets is a monthly peer-reviewed medical journal publishing review articles and original papers on recently identified novel molecular drug targets across all therapy areas. It was originally established as Emerging Therapeutic Targets in 1997, changing to its current name in 2001.

The journal evaluates molecules, signal pathways, receptors and other therapeutic targets and their potential as candidates for drug development. Articles in this journal focus on the molecular level and should not include clinical information on specific drugs

The audience consists of scientists, managers and decision makers in the pharmaceutical industry, academic researchers working in the field of molecular medicine and others closely involved in R&D.

The journal is published by Informa. The Editor in Chief of the journal is Professor Daniele Santini, University Campus Bio-Medico, Rome, Italy

== Indexing ==
Expert Opinion on Therapeutic Targets ranks #25 of 261 in the Pharmacology & Pharmacy category in the 2017 ISI Journal Citation Reports. The journal has a 2017 impact factor of 4.598.

The journal is indexed by Chemical Abstracts, Index Medicus/MEDLINE, ISI Alerting Services™, Science Citation Index Expanded, EMBASE/Excerpta Medica
