= Bernard Chevassus-au-Louis =

French biologist

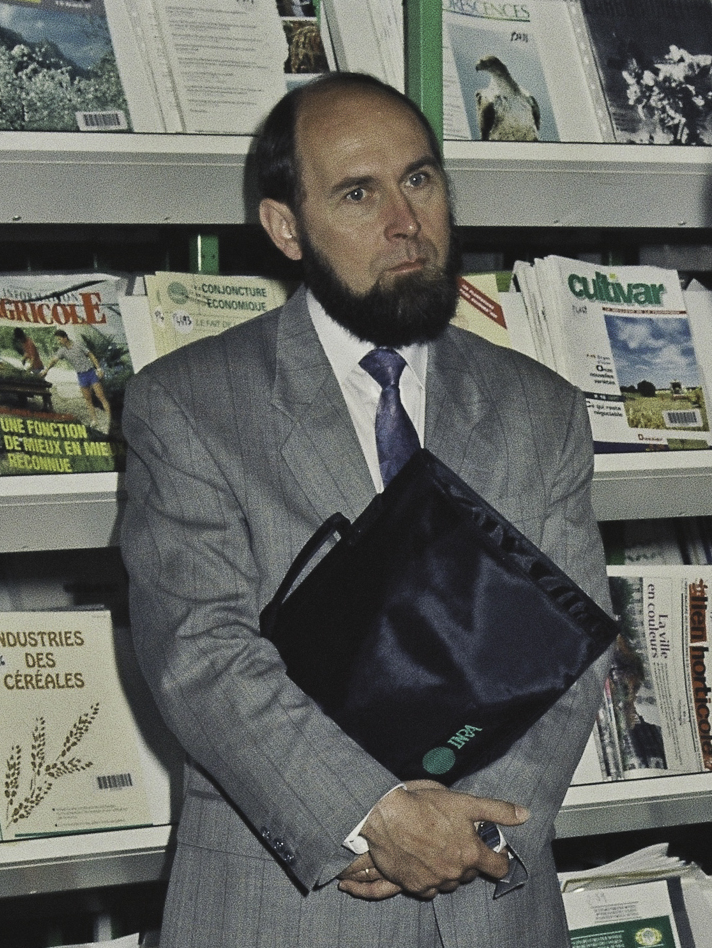
Visit of Bernard Chevassus-au-Louis to INRA in Versailles

Bernard Chevassus-au-Louis (born January 24, 1949, in Paris) is a French biologist and ecologist, who served as the president of the National Museum of Natural History, France from 2002 to 2006. He was knighted with the Ordre national du Mérite in 2001.
