= Isabelle Buret =

French engineer specializing in telecommunications and astronautics

- Born: Isabelle Urbin
- Education: Télécom ParisTech
- Occupation: Telecommunications engineer
- Known for: Knight, French Legion of Honour; Irène Joliot-Curie Prize

Isabelle Buret (née Urbin) is a French engineer specializing in telecommunications and astronautics. She was named a Knight in the National Order of the Legion of Honor in 2012.

== Life and work ==
Isabelle Buret graduated from Télécom ParisTech in a space telecom program that was offered at the time. The curriculum allowed her to pursue the combined passions for space science and telecommunications.

Following graduation in 1990, she spent two years in Japan as a visiting researcher at the Japanese satellite telecommunications laboratory of Nippon Telegraph and Telephone. At the time, she was the first female researcher to be hosted in NTT's Japanese satellite telecommunications laboratory.

When she returned to France in 1993, she joined Thales Alenia Space (then called Alcatel Espace) where she was responsible for the systems engineering program for the Globalstar project, one of the first two satellite telecom systems circling Earth in low orbit. In 1996, she worked there as an embedded digital design engineer. In 1999, she joined Thales Alenia Space, where she was responsible for research on telecommunications and navigation systems. In 2010, she was responsible for research and development and Telecommunications and Product Policy Manager. In 2013 she was appointed Head of Design for Iridium Next, the second generation of the Iridium telecommunications satellite constellation.

in 2017, Buret was named Technical Authority for the company's telecom business line and began working on a proposal for a new product, the Lightspeed system from Telesat, which required another constellation of satellites. As the proposal team's Chief Engineer, she was responsible for guaranteeing that the technical solution perfectly met its requirements in terms of performance, cost and scheduling.

Buret has been involved in the development of several public-private research collaborations and she represented Thales Alenia Space on the board of directors of the associative laboratory TéSA (Laboratory of Spatial and Aeronautical Telecommunications).

== Distinctions ==
- In 2012, she was named to the rank of Knight in the National Order of the Legion of Honor as “engineer, head of research and development for a space group; 22 years of service."
- In 2012, she received the Irène Joliot-Curie Prize in the “Woman in Business and Technology” category.
- In 2013, the daily newspaper La Tribune gave her one of its “Women's Awards” in the Industry category.

== Selected publications ==
Buret has authored more than 40 publications and 5 patents.

- Morlet, C., Boucheret, M. L., & Buret, I. (1998, November). Carrier recovery scheme for on-board demodulation suited to low E/sub b//N/sub 0. In IEEE GLOBECOM 1998 (Cat. NO. 98CH36250) (Vol. 6, pp. 3432–3436). IEEE.
- Buret, I., Sond, M., Sotom, M., & Gayrard, J. D. (2006). Advanced payload architectures for future telecommunication satellites. Revista de telecomunicaciones de Alcatel, (2), 121–124.
- Boucheret, M. L., Buret, I., Coulon, M., & Dervin, M. (2008). Utilisation de techniques d’étalement sélectif pour mission d’urgence (Doctoral dissertation, Institut National Polytechnique de Toulouse).
- Morlet, C., Buret, I., & Boucheret, M. L. (2000, June). A carrier phase estimator for multimedia satellite payloads suited to RSC coding schemes. In 2000 IEEE International Conference on Communications. ICC 2000. Global Convergence Through Communications. Conference Record (Vol. 1, pp. 455–459). IEEE.
- Corbel, E., Buret, I., Gayrard, J. D., Corazza, G. E., & Bolea-Alamanac, A. (2008, August). Hybrid satellite & terrestrial mobile network for 4G: Candidate architecture and space segment dimensioning. In 2008 4th Advanced Satellite Mobile Systems (pp. 162–166). IEEE.
