= Neuromuscular Disorders =

- Discipline: Neuromuscular disease
- Language: English
- Edited by: A. Oldfors

Publication details
- History: 1991-present
- Publisher: Elsevier
- Frequency: Monthly
- Impact factor: 4.296 (2020)

Standard abbreviations
- ISO 4: Neuromuscul. Disord.

Indexing
- CODEN: NEDIEC
- ISSN: 0960-8966 (print); 1873-2364 (web)
- OCLC no.: 24318845

Links
- Journal homepage; Online access; Online archive

Neuromuscular Disorders is a peer-reviewed medical journal that focuses on neuromuscular disease, including muscular dystrophy, spinal muscular atrophy, and myasthenia. It is the official journal of the World Muscle Society. It was established in 1991 and is published by Elsevier.
