= Paris Descartes University =

Former research university in Paris

- Université Paris 5 René Descartes
- Type: Public
- Active: 1970–2019
- Budget: Euro 340 Million(US $476 Million)
- Chancellor: Patrick Gérard; Chancellor of the Universities of Paris
- President: Frédéric Dardel
- Students: 33 500
- Undergraduates: 15 000
- Postgraduates: 18 500
- Location: Paris, France; 48°51′05″N 2°20′26″E
- Colours: Magenta and white
- Website: www.parisdescartes.fr
- France Paris

Paris Descartes University (French: Université Paris 5 René Descartes), also known as Paris V, was a French public university located in Paris. It was one of the inheritors of the historic University of Paris, which was split into 13 universities in 1970. Paris Descartes completely merged with Paris Diderot University in 2019 to form a new Paris Cité University.

It was established as a multidisciplinary university "of humanities and health sciences" ("des Sciences de l’Homme et de la Santé". It focused on the areas of medical sciences, biomedical sciences, law, computer science, social sciences, economics and psychology.

Its main campus was in the historic École de Chirurgie in the 6th arrondissement of Paris.

== History ==
The historic University of Paris (French: Université de Paris) first appeared in the second half of the 12th century, but was divided into thirteen universities, managed by a common rectorate, the Chancellerie des Universités de Paris, after the student protests of the French May.

== Administration ==
=== Campus ===
Descartes University has ten campuses in Paris. Its headquarters are centered on the "Collège de chirurgie", which was built in place of the "Collège de Bourgogne", in the Quartier Latin, on the rue des Écoles. The teaching facilities and the research laboratories are housed in the Saints-Pères university center, as far as the medical school and the social sciences school are concerned. The refurbished Henri-Piéron center contains the school of psychology, whereas the Law school is located in Malakoff. The dentistry school is located in Montrouge.

=== Admission ===
The undergraduate program of Paris Descartes is selective, with an acceptance rate of 11%. Admission to the second year of the university's master programs is selective as well, some of these programs admitting only 1.7% of applicants which can represent 25 students by programs.

=== International conventions ===
The University Paris V has signed over 150 conventions with foreign universities across five continents, including Manchester, Warwick, Copenhagen, Rome, Madrid, Rotterdam, Helsinki, Stockholm or Ghent.

== Research ==
=== Areas ===
The university focuses on medical sciences (medicine, dental medicine, pharmacy, psychology), biomedical sciences (cellular and molecular biology, biochemistry, chemistry, biomedical physics), social sciences (sociology, anthropology, linguistics, demographics, science of education), mathematics, computer science and law (information technology law, business law, tax law, public law, private law...).

The University Paris Descartes supports a modern approach to social sciences on the basis of fieldwork, participant observation and ethnography (master's degree in cultural and social anthropology at the School of Humanities and Social Sciences). The dual master's degree ("Economics and Psychology" and "Cogmaster") in partnership with other important French academic institutions such as Panthéon-Sorbonne University and the École Normale Supérieure emphasizes opportunities offered as far as research is concerned.

=== CESAMES ===
In 1994 Alain Ehrenberg founded and co-directed the research group "Psychotropics, Politics, Society" (Centre de recherche Psychotropes, Santé mentale, Société, a.k.a. CESAMES). This is a joint research unit of Paris Descartes and the Centre national de la recherche scientifique (CNRS - National Centre for Scientific Research), where Ehrenberg is professor of sociology.

== Rankings ==
University rankings

Global – Overall
- QS World: =441-450 (2018)

Paris Descartes was rated by the 2017 QS World University Rankings by Subject:

- 51–100th in Pharmacy and Pharmacology (1st ex aequo in France),
- 151–200 in Biological Sciences (4th ex aequo in France),
- 121 in Medicine (2nd in France),
- 251–300th in Psychology (2nd in France),
- 251–300th in Linguistics (3rd ex aequo in France)

It was also rated by the 2016/17 The Times Higher Education Subject Rankings as:

- 201–250 (4th ex aequo in France) in Medicine,
- 201–250 (1st in France) in Psychology.

In Law, in 2016/17, it was not ranked among the top 10 of France of Eduniversal rankings.

== Notable people ==
=== Faculty members ===
- Georges Balandier
- Jean-Michel Berthelot
- Erwan Dianteill
- Erol Gelenbe
- Axel Kahn
- Michel Kazatchkine
- Michel Maffesoli
- Hervé Morin
- Georges Vigarello

=== Alumni ===
- Amal Bourquia, Moroccan nephrologist, university professor, medical writer
- Olivier Brandicourt, physician and former CEO of Sanofi
- Jacqueline Dutheil de la Rochère, former president of Panthéon-Assas University
- Jon Elster, social and political theorist
- François Fillon, former French Prime Minister
- Béatrice Galinon-Mélénec, founder of the e. laboratory on Human Trace Complex System Unesco
- Nadey Hakim, surgeon and Vice President of the Royal Society of Medicine
- Keuky Lim, former Minister for Foreign Affairs of the Khmer Republic
- Ramata Ly-Bakayoko, Ivorian Minister of Women, Families, and Children
- Sophie Postel-Vinay, French physician and oncology researcher
- Élizabeth Teissier, astrologist

== Points of interest ==
- Jardin Botanique, Université Paris V
- Musée d'Anatomie Delmas-Orfila-Rouvière

== Gallery ==
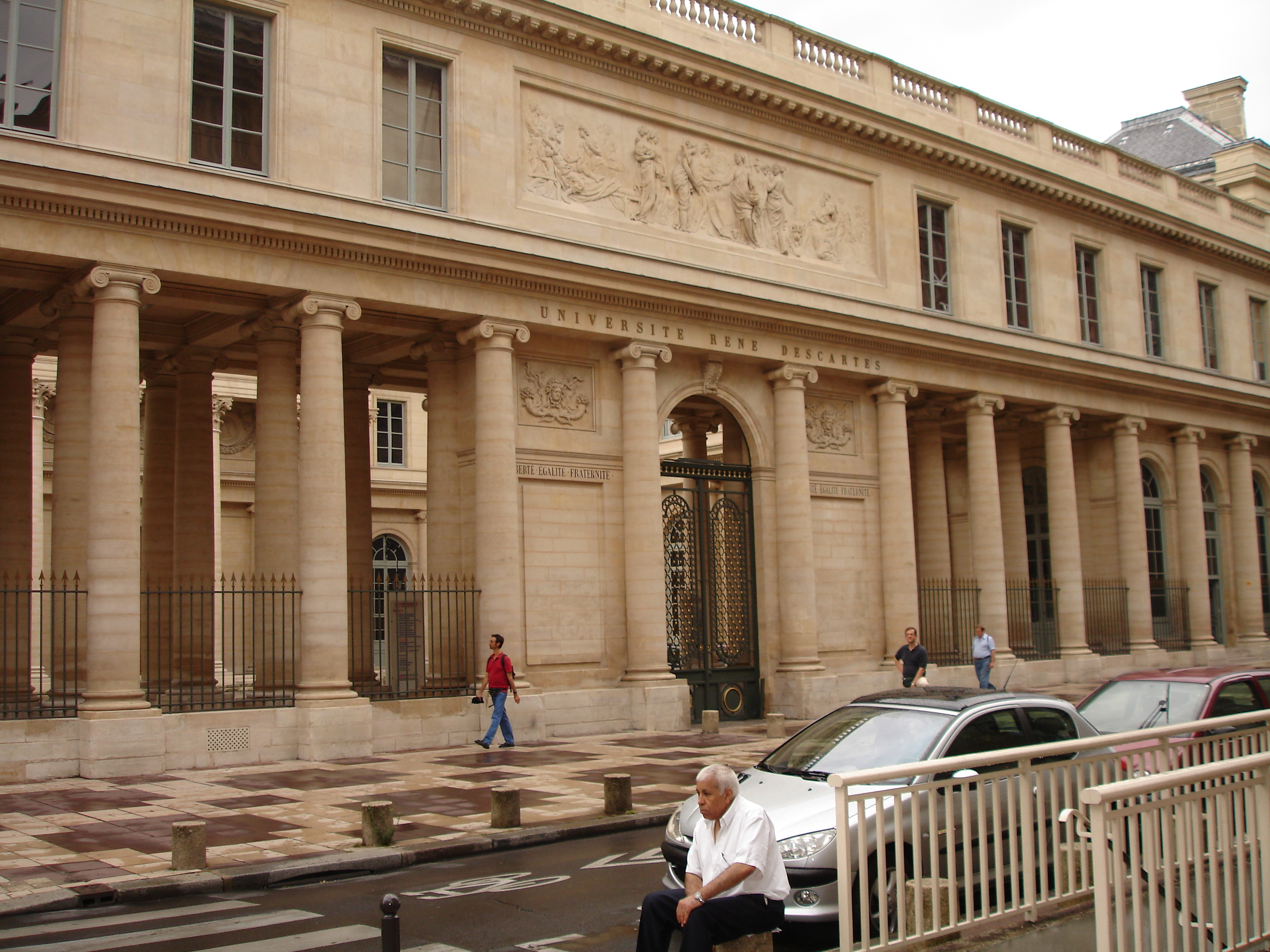
The historic École de Chirurgie, now the headquarters of Paris Descartes University

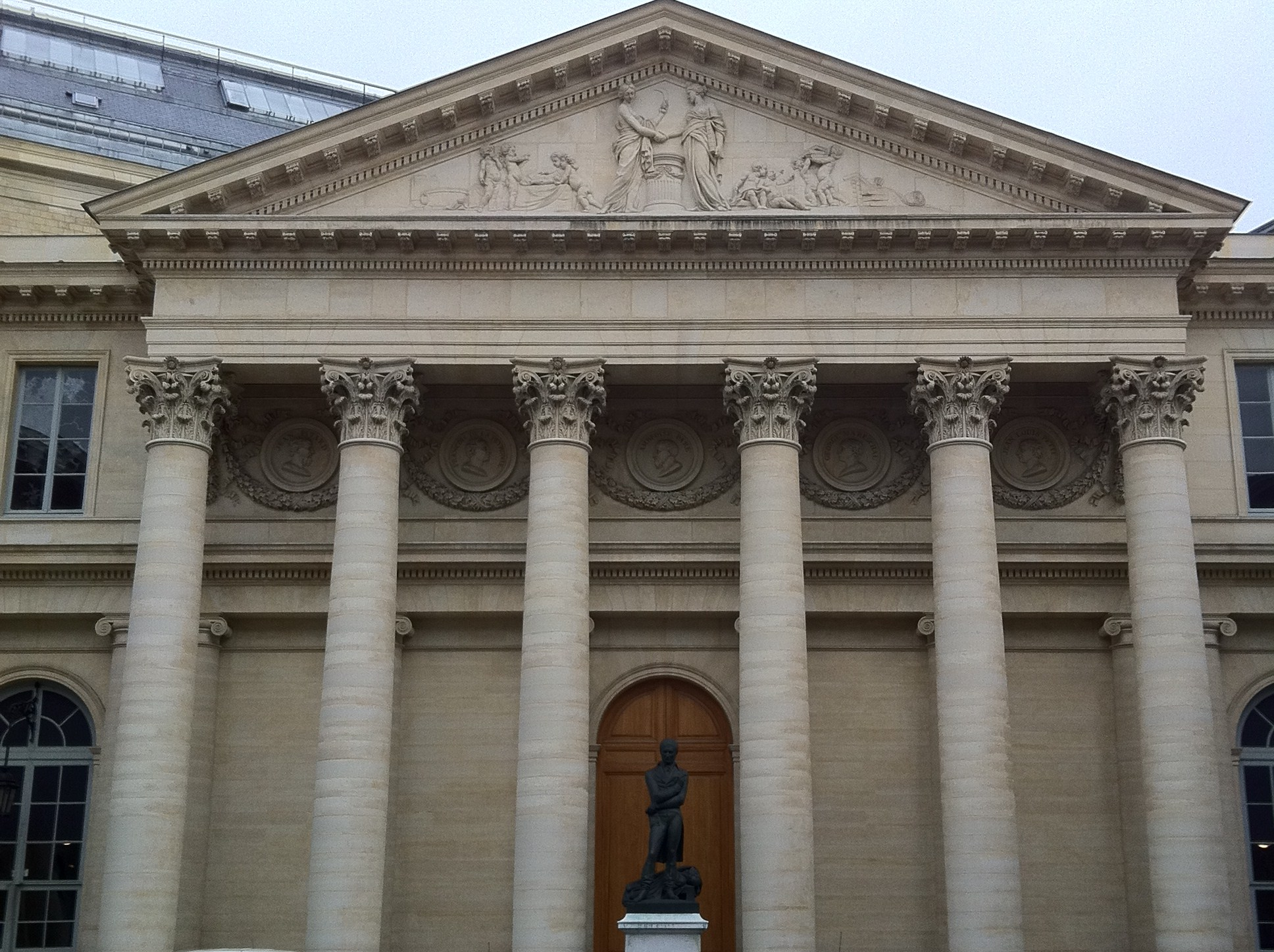
Facade of the famous Anatomy Theatre in the École de Chirurgie

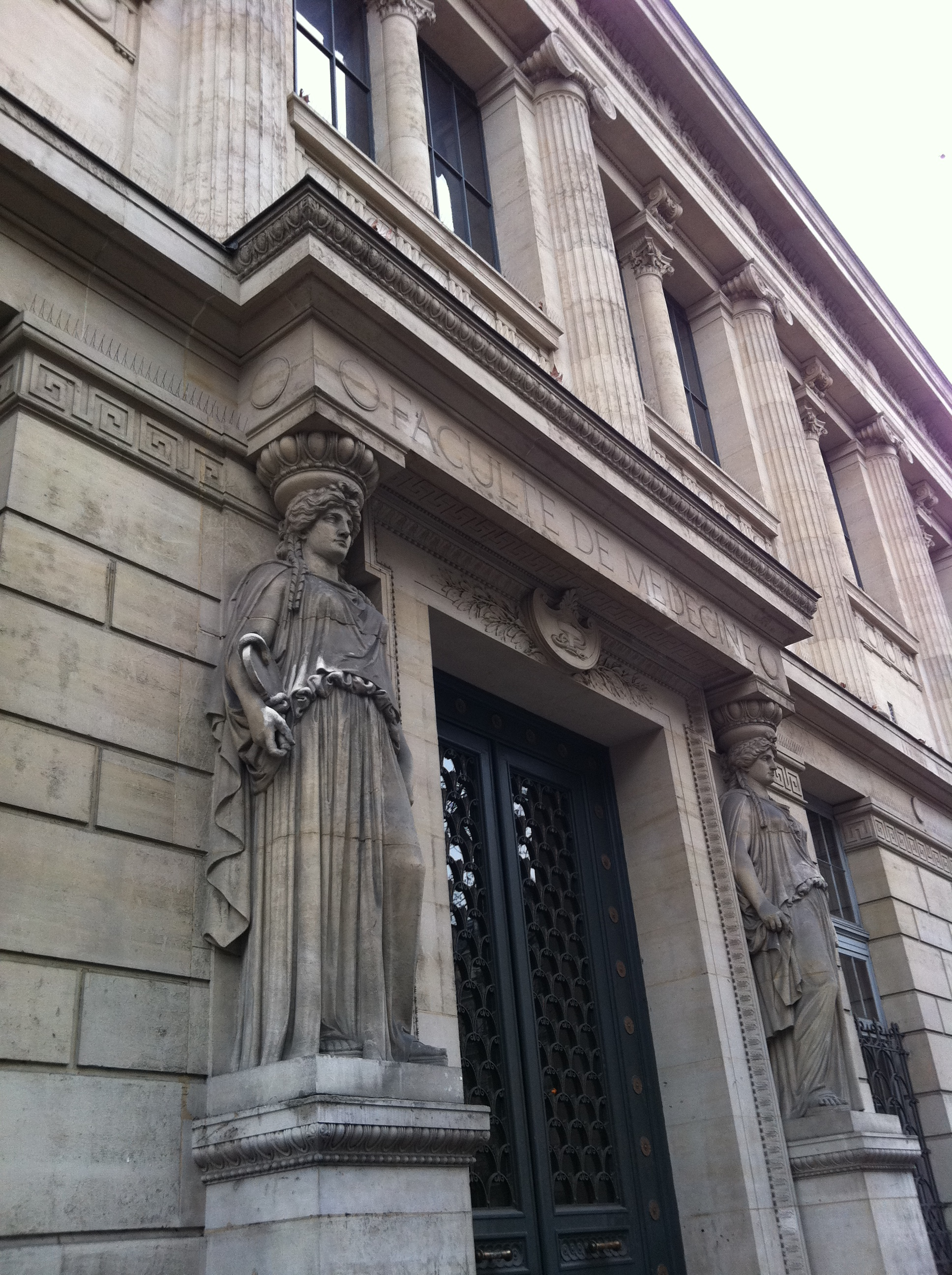
Paris Descartes Medecine on the boulevard Saint-Germain

== See also ==
- René Descartes – French polymath (1596–1650)
- A Clinical Lesson at the Salpêtrière – 1887 group tableau portrait by André Brouillet
