= Mines Paris – PSL =

French engineer school and a constituent college of Université PSL

Coordinates: 48.844952°N 2.339193°E

- École nationale supérieure des mines de Paris
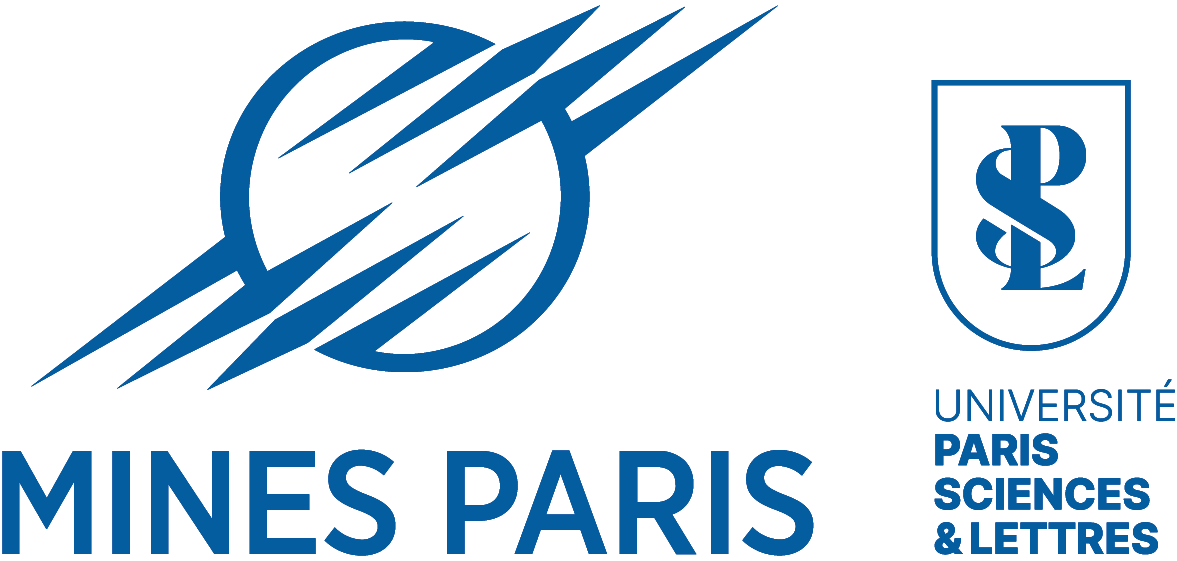
- Motto: Théorie et Pratique
- Motto in English: Theory and Practice
- Type: Grande école d'ingénieurs (public research university Engineering school)
- Established: 1783; 243 years ago
- Affiliations: Conférence des Grandes écoles Université PSL; Institut Mines-Télécom; ParisTech; Carnot M.I.N.E.S; Armines; Groupe des Écoles des mines
- Faculty: 286 permanent research professors
- Students: 1,281 students 37% international
- Location: Paris, France
- Campus: Paris, Fontainebleau, Évry, Sophia Antipolis
- Language: English-only & French-only instruction
- Website: www.minesparis.psl.eu

The Mines Paris – PSL, officially École nationale supérieure des mines de Paris, also known as École des mines de Paris, is a French grande école and a constituent college of PSL University. It was originally established in 1783 by King Louis XVI.

Mines Paris is distinguished for the outstanding performance of its research centers and the quality of its international partnerships with other prestigious universities in the world, which include Massachusetts Institute of Technology (MIT), California Institute of Technology (Caltech), Harvard John A. Paulson School of Engineering and Applied Sciences (Harvard SEAS), Shanghai Jiao Tong University, University of Hong Kong, National University of Singapore (NUS), Novosibirsk State University, Pontifical Catholic University of Chile, and Tokyo Tech.

Mines Paris also publishes a world university ranking based on the number of alumni holding the post of CEO in one of the 500 largest companies in the world: the Mines ParisTech: Professional Ranking of World Universities. The school is a member of the ParisTech (Paris Institute of Technology) alliance.

== History ==
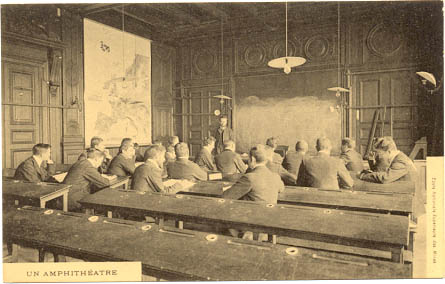
A classroom during the nineteenth century

A school of mining had been proposed by Henri Bertin in 1765. Still, it was the chemist Balthazar-Georges Sage who, though not a chemist of repute, was a royalist who was able to influence Jacques Necker (1732–1804) on the value of mineralogy in training students in mining. This was achieved through the use of his own large collections of minerals, and a chair in mineralogy was established on July 11, 1778. The school of mines was begun at the mint, the Hôtel de la Monnaie, Paris. The school was officially opened by decree of the French King's Council on March 19, 1783.

The school disappeared at the beginning of the French Revolution but was re-established by decree of the Committee of Public Safety in 1794, the 13th Messidor Year II. It moved to Savoie, after a decree of the consuls the 23rd Pluviôse Year X (1802).

After the Bourbon Restoration in 1814, the school moved to the Hôtel de Vendôme (in the 6th arrondissement in Paris' Jardin du Luxembourg). From the 1960s onwards, it created research laboratories in Fontainebleau, Évry, and Sophia Antipolis (Nice).

== Education ==
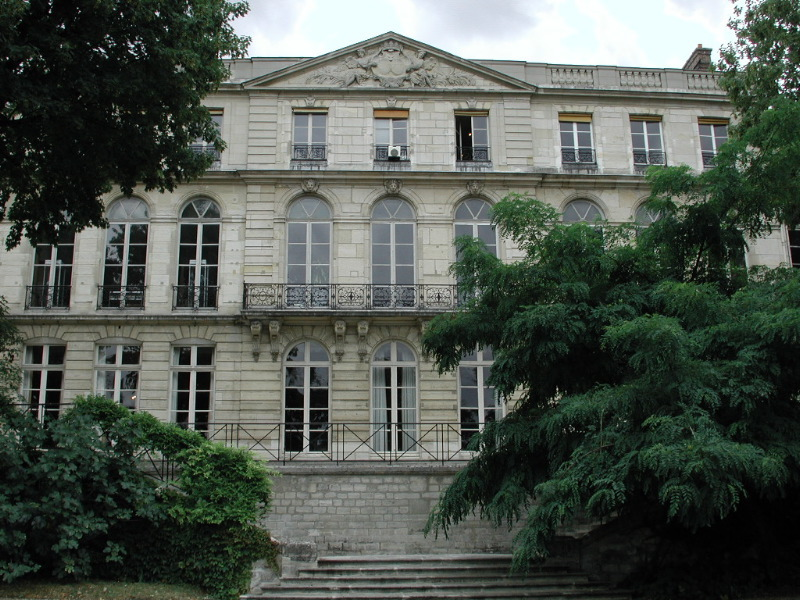
The Hôtel de Vendôme, central building of Mines ParisTech

École des mines de Paris is a member of the Groupe des écoles des mines (GEM), a group of 8 Institut Mines-Telecom (IMT) engineering schools that are Grandes Écoles, a French institution of higher education that is separate from, but parallel and connected to the main framework of the French public university system. Similar to the Ivy League in the United States, Oxbridge in the UK, and C9 League in China, Grandes Écoles are elite academic institutions that admit students through an extremely competitive process. Alums go on to occupy elite positions within government, administration, and corporate firms in France.

The initial aim of the École des mines de Paris, namely to train high-level mining engineers, evolved with time to adapt to the technological and structural transformations undergone by society. Mines Paris - PSL has now become one of the most prestigious French engineering schools with a broad variety of subjects. Its students are trained to hold management positions, work in research and development departments, or serve as operations officers, among other roles. They receive a well-rounded education in a variety of subjects, ranging from the most technical (Mathematics, Physics) to economics, social sciences or even art, to be able to tackle the management or engineering-related issues they are to face. Exchange programs are possible during the third semester with prestigious universities around the world, such as Massachusetts Institute of Technology (MIT), California Institute of Technology (Caltech), University of Hong Kong, National University of Singapore (NUS), Tokyo Tech, Seoul National University...

Although the IMT engineering schools are more expensive than public universities in France, Grandes Écoles typically have much smaller class sizes and student bodies, and many of their programs are taught in English. International internships, study abroad opportunities, and close ties with government and the corporate world are a hallmark of the Grandes Écoles. Many of the top-ranked schools in Europe are members of the Conférence des Grandes Écoles (CGE), as are the IMT engineering schools. Degrees from the IMT are accredited by the Conférence des Grandes Écoles and awarded by the Ministry of National Education (France) (French: Le Ministère de L'éducation Nationale).

Mines Paris – PSL provides different educational paths:

- The Ingénieurs civils degree (Master of Science and Executive Engineering), ranked among the best French grandes écoles engineering degrees, similar to that offered at École polytechnique, École des Ponts ParisTech, Institut Supérieur de l'Aéronautique et de l'Espace (SUPAERO), and CentraleSupélec.
- The Corps of Mines, one of the greatest technical corps of the French state. It is a third-cycle degree, lasting three years, consisting of two long-term internships in both public and private economic institutions, as well as courses in economics and public administration. The admission to the Corps des Mines is highly selective as only the top students from École polytechnique, École normale supérieure, Mines ParisTech and Telecom Paris may apply.
- Mastère Spécialisé degree, (post-graduate specialization degree) post-graduate programs accredited by the Conférence des Grandes écoles, in the fields of Energy, Environment, Transport and Logistics, Informatics, Safety and management in industry and Materials engineering.
- Doctoral (19 schools) and Master's (9 programs) studies in various fields. One Bachelor's program will start in September 2026.

For students having studied in the Classe Préparatoire aux Grandes Ecoles (a two-year highly selective undergraduate program in Mathematics, Physics and Engineering, among others), admission to Civil Engineer of Mines is decided through a nationwide competitive examination. Every year, ten additional applications are accepted from students around the world based on their academic achievements.

Admission to the Corps of Mines is possible for French students at the end of their studies in École polytechnique, École normale supérieure, École des télécommunications de Paris and École des mines de Paris (these last two, after a specific examination), or from the other grand technical corps of the French state. Admission in the third year is also open to one PhD graduate.

== Rankings ==
National ranking (ranked as Mines Paris for its Master of Science in Engineering)

Name	Year	National ranking
DAUR Rankings	2024	2
L’Étudiant	2024	3
L’Usine nouvelle	2024	2
Le Figaro	2024	2

International Rankings (Ranked as PSL University)

Name	Year	World ranking	National ranking (France)
CWUR	2025	19	1
QS Top Universities	2024	24	1
Shanghai Ranking	2024	33	2
Times Higher Education	2025	42	1

== Student unions and organizations ==
A Student Union is elected every year after a one-week campaign. It is in charge of enhancing the contact between students and various sponsoring industries as well as organizing events for the students.

Various other organizations are part of students' lives: the Students' Sport Committee (BDS), the Junior Enterprise (JUMP), the Arts' Office (BDA), Cahier Vert (social opening and tutoring), CAV (wine-tasting club), Catholic community, fanfare band, entrepreneur club (Mines Genius), humanitarian organizations (Heliotopia, Ceres, Zanbinou), photography club, and sailing club, among others.

== Alumni ==
Nobel prize winners who attended Mines ParisTech

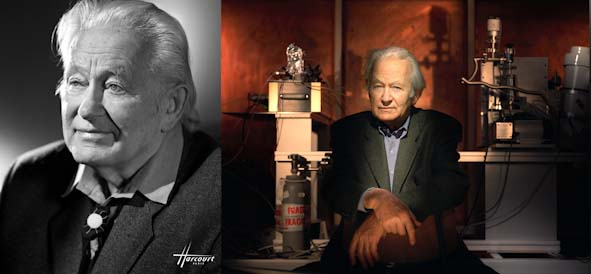
Georges Charpak, Physics, 1992

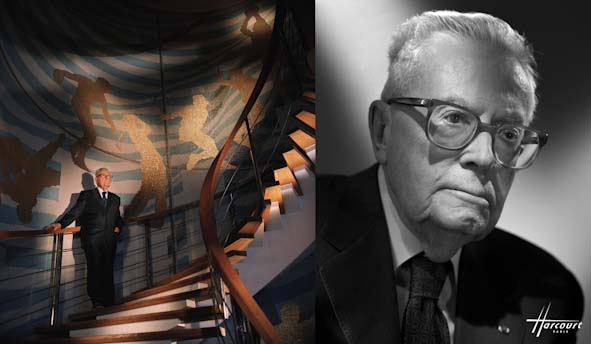
Maurice Allais, Economics, 1988

Academics & Scientists

- Maurice Allais (1911–2010), Nobel Prize in Economics, 1988
- Louis Paul Cailletet (1832–1913), physicist and inventor
- Marie-Adolphe Carnot (1839–1920), chemist, mining engineer and politician, after whom the uranium ore carnotite is named
- Georges Charpak (1924–2010), Nobel Prize in Physics 1992
- Ignacy Domeyko (1802–1889), geologist, mineralogist, educator, rector of the University of Chile
- Jean-Baptiste Élie de Beaumont (1798–1874), founder of geology, Wollaston Medal 1843
- Jean-Jacques Favier (born 1949), astronaut
- Philippe Jamet (born 1961), Director General of IONIS Education Group
- Auguste Laurent (1808–1853), chemist, precursor of modern organic chemistry
- Alfred-Marie Liénard (1869–1958), known for the Liénard–Wiechert potential
- Sylvaine Neveu (born 1968), chemist and scientific director of the Solvay group
- Henri Poincaré (1854–1912), mathematician and physicist
- Mariano Eduardo de Rivero y Ustáriz (1798–1857), mineralogist, founding director of the first school of mines and natural history museum in Gran Colombia
- Léon Walras (1834–1910), mathematical economist

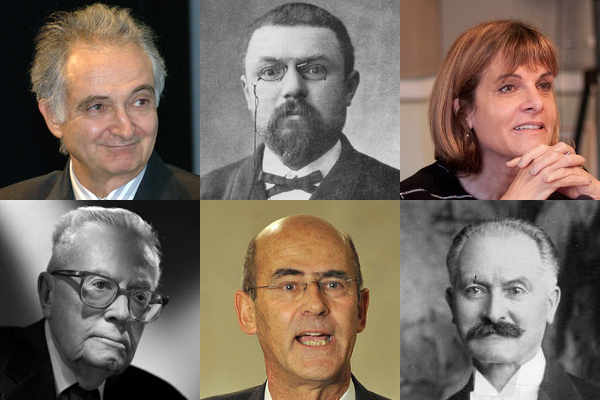
from the left to the right and the top to the bottom: Jacques Attali (author, economist), Henri Poincaré (mathematician, physicist), Anne Lauvergeon (business executive), Maurice Allais (Nobel Prize in Economics), Patrick Kron (business executive) and Albert Lebrun (President of France).

Business leaders

- Jacques Aschenbroich, CEO of Valeo (since 2009)
- Jean-Louis Beffa, CEO of Saint-Gobain (1986–2007)
- Jean-Laurent Bonnafé, CEO of BNP Paribas (since 2011)
- Eckley Brinton Coxe (1839–1895), owner of Coxe Brothers and Company, Pennsylvania State Senator
- Thierry Desmarest, CEO of Total (1995–2010)
- Jean-Martin Folz, CEO of PSA Peugeot Citroën (1995–2007)
- Noël Forgeard, former CEO of Airbus (1998–2005) and EADS (2005–2006)
- Carlos Ghosn, CEO of Nissan (2001–2018) and CEO of Renault-Nissan (2005–2018)
- Odile Hembise Fanton d'Andon, CEO of ACRI-ST (since 2000)
- Anne Lauvergeon, CEO of Areva (2001–2011)
- Didier Lombard, CEO of France Télécom (2005–2010)
- Francis Mer, CEO of Usinor (1986–2001) and former Minister of Finances of France (2002–2004)
- Patrick Pouyanné, CEO of TotalEnergies (since 2014)
- Denis Ranque, CEO of Thales Group (1998–2009)
- Anne Rigail, CEO of Air France (since 2018)
- Tidjane Thiam, CEO of Credit Suisse (2015–2020)

Entrepreneurs

- Franck Le Ouay and Romain Nicolli, co-founders of Criteo

Politicians

- Jean-Louis Bianco (born 1943), General Secretary of the President of France (1982–1991), Minister of Social Affairs (1991–1992), Minister of Transport (1992–1993), deputy for Alpes de Haute Provence's 1st constituency (from 1997)
- Najla Bouden Romdhane (born 1958), prime minister of Tunisia (from 2021)
- Charles de Freycinet, prime minister of France at the end of the 19th century
- Albert François Lebrun (1871–1950), president of France
- Alain Poher (1909–1996), politician, president of the Sénat, interim president of the French Republic
- Adam Seybert (1773–1825), American congressman and mineralogist

== Research centres ==
=== Energy and Processes ===
- CES (Energy efficiency of Systems Center)
- CTP (Thermodynamics of Processes Center)
- OIE (Observation, Impacts, Energy Center)
- PERSEE (Processes, Renewable Energies and Energy Systems Center)

=== Mathematics and Systems ===
- CAOR (Robotics Center)
- CAS (Automatic Control and Systems Center)
- CBIO (Computational Biology Center)
- CMA (Applied Mathematics Center)
- CMM (Mathematical Morphology Center)
- CRI (Computer Science Center)

=== Earth Science and Environment ===
- Geosciences (Geosciences and Geoengineering Center). Located in Fontainebleau, the Geosciences and Geoengineering Department (a research structure common to Mines ParisTech and Armines) focuses on research and teaching activities in the field of Earth and Environmental Sciences.
- ISIGE (Environmental Engineering and Management Center)

=== Economics, Management, Society ===
- CERNA (Industrial Economics Center)
- CGS (Scientific Management Center)
- CRC (Crisis and Risk Research Center)
- CSI (Sociology of Innovation Center)

=== Mechanical and Materials Engineering ===
- CEMEF (Material Forming Center)
- Materials Center

== Other schools of Mines in France ==
- École nationale supérieure des Mines d'Albi Carmaux (Mines Albi-Carmaux)
- École nationale supérieure des Mines d'Alès (Mines Alès)
- École nationale supérieure des Mines de Douai (Mines Douai)
- École nationale supérieure des Mines de Nancy
- École nationale supérieure des Mines de Nantes (Mines Nantes)
- École nationale supérieure des mines de Saint-Étienne (Mines Saint-Étienne)

== Other schools of Mines in the UK ==
- Royal School of Mines
- Camborne School of Mines

== Other schools of Mines in Africa ==
- École nationale supérieure des Mines de Rabat (Mines Rabat)

== Other schools of Mines in the USA ==
- Colorado School of Mines
- Columbia School of Mines

== See also ==
- PSL Research University
- ParisTech
- Institut Mines-Télécom
- École des mines d'Albi-Carmaux
- École des mines d'Alès
- École des mines de Douai
- École des mines de Nantes
- École nationale supérieure des mines de Nancy
- École nationale supérieure des mines de Saint-Étienne
- École Nationale Supérieure des Mines de Rabat
- Musée de Minéralogie
- Télécom SudParis
- Mines ParisTech: Professional Ranking of World Universities
