= Frédéric Sanchez (businessman) =

Chairman of Orange Group

- Born: 13 March 1960 (age 66); Castres, France
- Education: HEC Paris; Sciences Po; Paris Dauphine University
- Occupation: Chairman of Orange

Frédéric Sanchez (born 13 March 1960) is the Chairman of French telecoms company Orange since March 2026.

== Education ==
Frédéric Sanchez graduated from HEC Paris in 1983, Paris Dauphine University in 1984 and Sciences Po in 1985.

== Career ==
He began his career in 1985 with Renault in Mexico and the United States, and then joined Ernst & Young in late 1987 as an engagement manager. In 1990, he joined the Fives-Lille Group, where he held various positions before becoming Chief Financial Officer in 1994, Managing Director in 1997, and finally Chairman of the Executive Board in 2002. Fives—the new name for "Compagnie de Fives-Lille" since 2007—became a Société par actions simplifiée company (SAS) in 2018, led by Frédéric Sanchez as Chairman.

In addition, Frédéric Sanchez is Chairman of MEDEF International and chairs the France-United Arab Emirates and France-Japan Business Councils within MEDEF International. He is also a member of the Supervisory Boards of STMicroelectronics N.V. and Théa Holding SAS, and a board member of Bureau Veritas SA. Finally, he is Honorary Chairman of the Alliance Industrie du Futur (Alliance for the Industry of the Future) and chairs the "Solutions for the Industry of the Future" (SIF) sector committee within the National Industry Council (CNI).

On 19 March 2026, he was nominated Chairman of Orange, replacing Jacques Aschenbroich.

Business positions
| Preceded by Jacques Aschenbroich | Chairman of Orange Group; 2026 | Succeeded by |
