= Benoît Bazin =

French businessman

Benoît Jean Louis Bazin
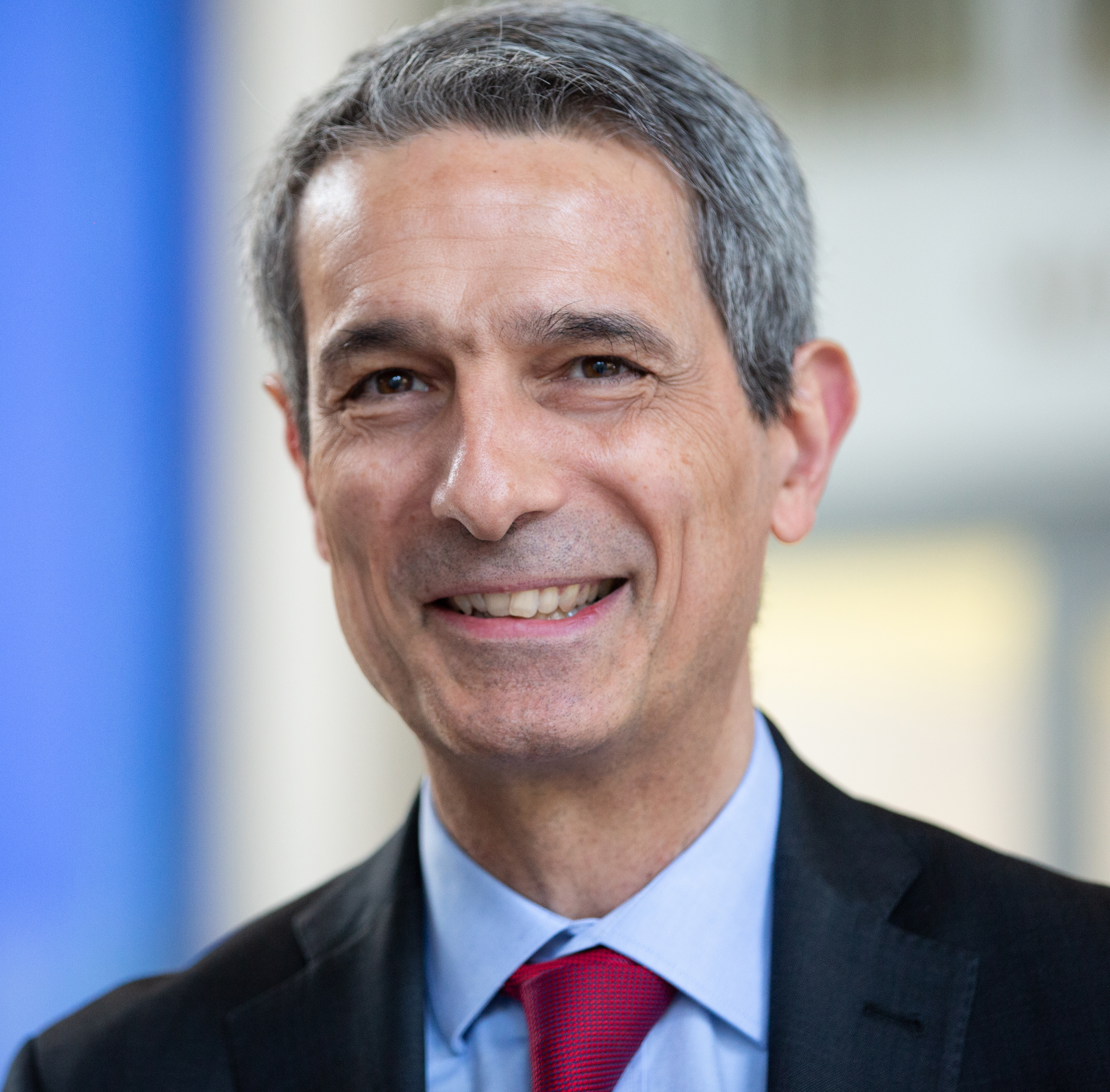
- Bazin in 2023
- Born: 29 December 1968 (age 57); Boulogne-Billancourt, France
- Education: École polytechnique École des ponts ParisTech; Sciences Po Paris; Massachusetts Institute of Technology
- Occupation: CEO of Saint-Gobain Group

Benoît Jean Louis Bazin (born December 29, 1968, in Boulogne-Billancourt) is a French manager and the CEO of Saint-Gobain since June 6, 2024.

== Biography ==
Bazin grew up as the son of two doctors. After completing his baccalaureate at the Malherbe high school in Caen and preparatory classes at the Louis-le-Grand high school in Paris, he began studying at the École polytechnique in 1989 and later at the École nationale des ponts et chaussées. Bazin received a diploma of advanced studies in economics from the Institut d’études politiques de Paris in 1994 and a Master of Science from the Massachusetts Institute of Technology in 1995.

Bazin is married and has a daughter. He is also the chairman of the ProQuartett association - European Center for Chamber Music.

== Career ==
Bazin started working for the French Ministry of Economy and Finance in 1995 as a rapporteur for the Committee on Industrial Restructuring and worked in various positions until 1999. In 1999, he joined the Saint-Gobain Group as Planning Director. From May 2005 to April 2009, Bazin was the Group's Finance Director, and in April 2010 he was appointed Head of Building Products and Deputy Managing Director.

On January 1, 2019, Bazin was appointed Deputy General Manager of Saint-Gobain. By resolution of the shareholders' meeting in November 2023, Bazin replaced the then Managing Director Pierre-André de Chalendar in June 2024 and became the new CEO of Compagnie de Saint-Gobain.

Bazin is also a director of the construction group Vinci S.A., a member of the board of directors of the Cité de l'architecture et du patrimoine and was a director of Essilor International from May 2009 to March 2017.
