= SAGE Electrochromics =

Company based in Minnesota, U.S.

SAGE Electrochromics, Inc.
- Type: Private
- Industry: Architectural glass
- Founded: 1989
- Founder: John Van Dine
- Headquarters: 44°19′42″N 93°17′29″W, Faribault, MN, USA
- Products: Electrochromic glass
- Number of employees: 231 (2016)
- Website: www.sageglass.com

SAGE Electrochromics, Inc., a wholly owned subsidiary of Saint-Gobain, is a specialized window glass developer based in Faribault, Minnesota.

The company develops electronically tintable smart glass (also called electrochromic glass, EC, or dynamic glass), for use in building windows, skylights and curtainwalls, that can be electronically tinted or cleared to optimize daylight and improve occupant comfort in buildings.

The U.S. Department of Energy’s (DOE) Lawrence Berkeley National Laboratory (LBNL), SAGE's SageGlass technology could potentially reduce the size of building heating and air conditioning equipment size by up to 25%, which may lead to construction cost savings."

== History ==
The company was founded in 1989 by former CEO John Van Dine as Sun Active Glass Electrochromics, Inc. (SAGE) in a Valley Cottage, New York, laboratory. In 1992 the company moved to Rutgers University’s Department of Ceramic Science and Engineering for R&D collaboration with Rutgers scientists.

In 1994, the company changed its name to SAGE Electrochromics, Inc.

It moved to Faribault, Minnesota, in 1998, where over the next five years it refined the production process and testing of its first commercial product, SageGlass, in its pilot line facility. Samples of these insulating glass units (IGUs) were tested by the Department of Energy in the glass fabricating and OEM skylight industry.

In 2005, SAGE moved to its new headquarters and manufacturing facility, and commercially launched its first-generation SageGlass product.

In March 2010, SAGE announced more than $100 million in DOE funding and Internal Revenue Service (IRS) tax credits to build a new facility in Faribault, Minnesota, to mass-produce SageGlass IGUs.

The company ultimately decided to withdraw from the government funding program. Shortly thereafter, the company announced a new product that combines electrochromic technology with low U-factor triple-pane window glass construction.

On November 10, 2010, Saint-Gobain, a French glass and building materials company acquired 50 percent of the SAGE. The companies aimed to collaborate on electrochromic glass technology and research and development. Additionally, they initiated plans to build a large-scale electrochromic glass plant in Faribault, Minnesota.

In May 2012 Saint-Gobain announced they had acquired 100% of SAGE. The company became a wholly owned subsidiary of Saint-Gobain at that time.

In 2012, the company filed a patent infringement suit against View; View counter-sued a few months later.

== Funding ==
In July 2007, the company received $16 million in Series B financing from Good Energies, Applied Ventures, LLC and Bekaert. In February 2009, SAGE received an additional $20 million round from the same investors.

As of 2010, SAGE Electrochromics has received more than $50 million in venture capital funding and government grants.

In March 2010, U.S. Energy Secretary Steven Chu revealed that the DOE had provisionally approved a $72 million loan guarantee for Sage. This was in addition to the $31 million Advanced Energy Manufacturing Tax Credit SAGE previously awarded the company. The loan guarantee and tax credits are to be used to help SAGE establish a new facility to expand production and lower costs of its electrochromic glass, with the goal to make buildings more energy efficient and create new green manufacturing and construction jobs. The funding was granted under the Department of Energy’s Loan Guarantee Program, established under the Energy Policy Act of 2005, to support new technologies that reduce or sequester greenhouse gases.

Sant-Gobain's 50 percent acquisition of SAGE in November 2010 represented an additional $80 million investment. SAGE will manufacture the electrochromic glass for both companies at the new Faribault, Minnesota, plant. The facility will allow production of larger sheets of dynamic glass at high volumes, making it feasible for widespread building applications.

== Technology ==
SageGlass is electronically tintable glass for use in buildings. It incorporates nanotechnology consisting of five layers of ceramic materials, which have a total thickness that is less than 1/50th that of a human hair. When voltage is applied [less than 5V DC] it darkens as lithium ions and associated electrons transfer from the counter electrode to an electrochromic electrode layer (see Figure 1). Reversing the voltage polarity causes the ions and associated electrons to return to their original layer, the counter electrode, and the glass clears. This solid state electrochromic reaction is controlled through a low voltage DC power supply. When the SageGlass coating darkens, the sun’s light and heat are absorbed and subsequently reradiated from the glass surface to the exterior.

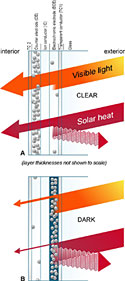
Figure 1: How electrochromic glass works.

Electrochromic IGUs offer various benefits: they help mitigate solar heat gain, diminish glare, reduce fading of materials, and might reduce the need for window shades and awnings. Moreover, they allow building occupants to maintain a view of the outdoors.

== See also ==
- Smart glass
- Electrochromism
