= Jacques Aschenbroich =

French businessperson

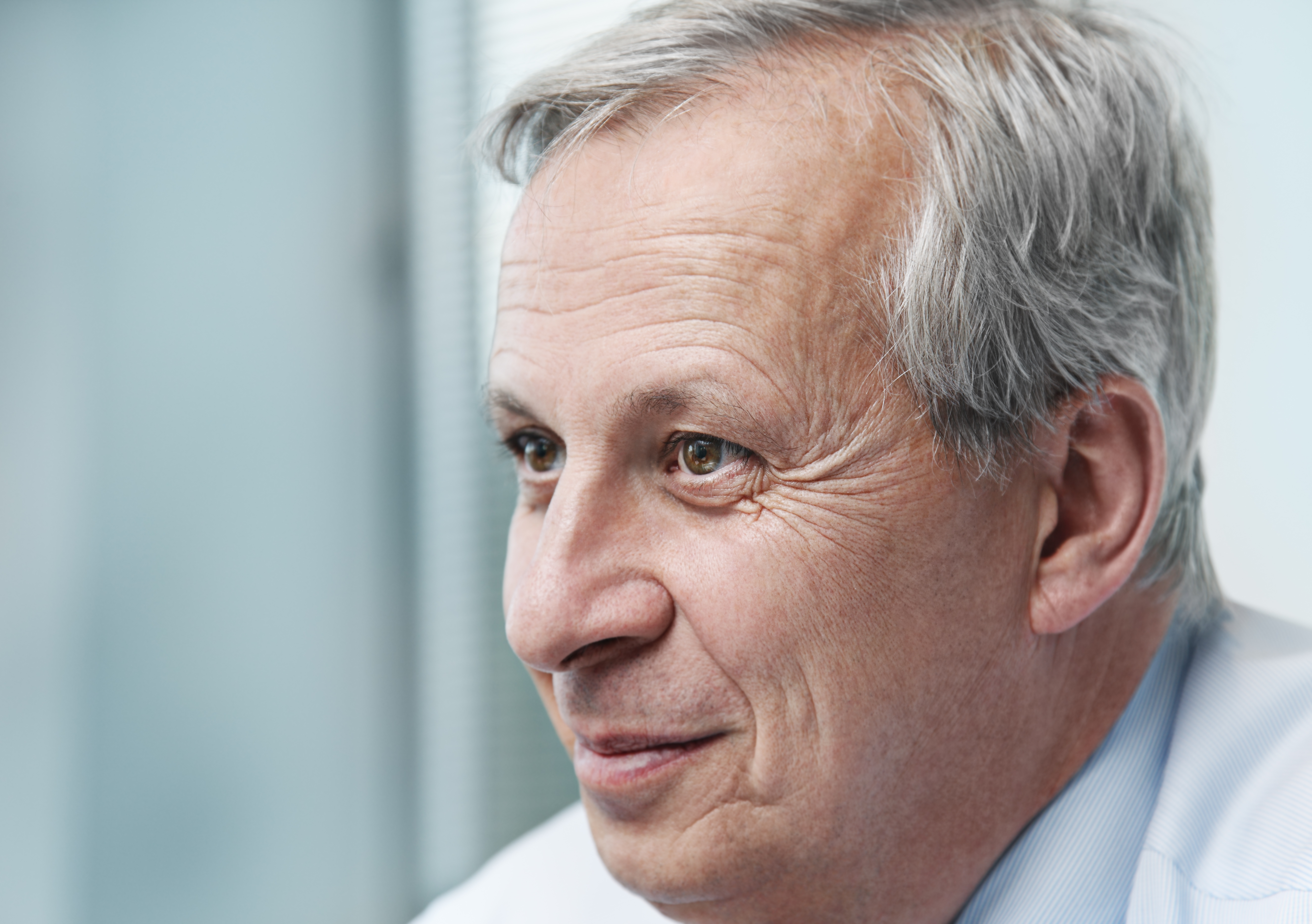
- Born: 3 June 1954 (age 72); Lyon, France
- Education: Lycée du Parc; École des Mines de Paris
- Occupation: Chairman of Orange

Jacques André Aschenbroich (born 3 June 1954) is the Chairman of French telecoms company Orange. He is the former CEO of Valeo and held the position between 2016 and 2022.

== Education ==
- Baccalauréat at the Lycée Ampère in Lyon
- Preparatory classes for the "Grandes écoles" at the Lycée du Parc in Lyon
- École nationale supérieure des mines de Paris (Engineer's degree)
- Engineer of the "Corps of Mines"

== Career ==
=== Career in the public sector ===
After holding different posts in the French civil service, Aschenbroich was a member of the Prime Minister's cabinet in 1987 and 1988.

- 1982: Deputy Regional Director, responsible for the Industrial Development Division at the Industry and Research Regional Management for Lorraine
- 1983-1985: "Chargé de mission" for Economic Problems to the Prefect, Commissioner of the Republic for the Lorraine region, and deputy regional delegate for the Agence nationale de la valorisation et de la recherche (Anvar)
- 1985-1987: "Chargé de mission" at the Délégation à l'aménagement du territoire (Datar)
- 1985-1986: Secretary general of the Interministerial Committee for Assistance in localising activities (Ciala) for the Datar
- 1986-1987: Team Coordinator for localising industrial and tertiary activities for the
- 1987-1988: Technical adviser for industrial affairs in Prime Minister Jacques Chirac’s cabinet

=== Saint-Gobain, 1988–2008 ===
Aschenbroich then moved into industry and was with the Saint-Gobain Group from 1988 to 2008. He directed the Group's subsidiaries in Brazil and Germany before becoming managing director of the Flat Glass Division of the Compagnie de Saint-Gobain. He went on to become President of Saint-Gobain Vitrage in 1996. From October 2001 to December 2008, he was Senior Vice-president of Saint-Gobain, managing the Flat Glass and High Performance Materials sectors from January 2007, and the Group's operations in the United States from September 2007.

- 1989-1991: General Manager of Sama (Saint Gobain Group)
- 1989-1991: Secretary general of Brasilit (Saint Gobain Group)
- 1991-1993: Member of the supervisory board and General Manager of the Building Division of Végla (Saint Gobain Group)
- 1993-1996: Chairman of the supervisory board of Végla (Saint Gobain Group)
- 1994: CEO of Sekurit Saint-Gobain international (Saint Gobain Group)
- 1996-2007: Chairman and CEO of Saint-Gobain Vitrage and General Manager of the Flat Glass Division
- 2001-2008: Senior Vice-president of the Saint Gobain Group
- 2007-2008: General Manager of the Flat Glass, High Performance Materials and Innovation Divisions of the Saint-Gobain Group
- 2007-2008: General delegate for the United States and Canada for the Saint-Gobain Group

=== Valeo, 2009–2022 ===
An acknowledged specialist in the industry, Aschenbroich was appointed CEO and Member of the Board of the automotive parts maker Valeo in 2009. From March 2009 to January 2022, he has implemented a new strategic plan to ensure the Group's growth in two strategic directions: technologies for reducing CO_{2} emissions and emerging markets. He has launched a reorganisation of the Group around 4 main Business Groups: Comfort & Driving Assistance Systems, Powertrain Systems, Thermal Systems, and Visibility Systems.

== Other activities ==
=== Corporate boards ===
- BNP Paribas, Member of the Board of Directors (since 2023)
- Orange, Chair of the Board of Directors (since 2022)
- Total S.A., Independent Member of the Board of Directors (since 2021)

=== Non-profit organizations ===
- Institut de la Finance Durable (IFD), Vice-Chair of the Board of Directors (since 2022)
- Trilateral Commission, Member of the European Group
- Foreign Trade France, Adviser
- Ecole nationale supérieure des mines de Paris, Member of the Board

He was:

- Member of the Improvement Committee for the Ecole nationale supérieure des mines de Paris

== Honours ==
- Chevalier of the Legion of Honor
- Knight of the Ordre national du Mérite
- Order of the Rising Sun, 2nd Class, Gold and Silver Star (2025)

Business positions
Preceded by Thierry Morin	CEO of Valeo; 2009–2022	Succeeded by Christophe Périllat

== Personal ==
He is married and the father of three children.
