= Saint-Gobain SEFPRO =

French multinational refractory materials company

- The Saint-Gobain SEFPRO logo
- Predecessor: Société Européenne des Produits Réfractaires; Société Générale de Produits Réfractaires; L'Electro-Réfractaires
- Founded: 1929 in Modane, France
- Headquarters: Le Pontet, France
- Products: Refractories for Glass furnaces: AZS Fused Cast refractories, High Zirconia, Alumina, Sintered refractories, Unshaped refractory materials, Cruciforms, Expendables
- Number of employees: 2200
- Parent: Saint-Gobain
- Website: www.sefpro.com

Saint-Gobain SEFPRO (Sintered and Electrofused Products), founded in 1929, produces refractories for the glass industry. The company consists of plants, sales offices and Research and Development Centers employing over 2200 people across four continents, with headquarters in Le Pontet, Vaucluse, France. The group belongs to the Innovative Materials division of the Saint-Gobain group.

== History ==
The first electro-fused product was invented and developed in the 1920s by the laboratory of Corning Glass Works, the American glassmaker partnered with Hartford Empire Co. Production began at Corhart Refractories Co., a Corning subsidiary, in 1927.

In 1929, a joint venture between Corning and Saint-Gobain, another leading glassmaker, established L'Electro-Réfractaire in Modane, France, with their principal product the Corhart Standard. By 1940, the company was producing 2000 tons of the product per year. In 1942, a new, even more hard-wearing product was introduced: Corhart ZAC. New, pure raw materials were used, such as Zircon, Alumina and Silica (later known as AZS). During the Second World War, the Modane factory was destroyed. In 1947, a new production site was selected in Le Pontet, located in the department of Vaucluse in France, some 350 km from the original location. This would later become the group's headquarters. Workers from the Modane plant relocated to Vaucluse to work in the new factory.

The relocation to Le Pontet was influenced by access to key raw materials such as high-purity bauxite from southern France, alumina supplied by Péchiney in Gardanne, and silica sand from the Mont Ventoux region, as well as its proximity to the port of Marseille and the Rhône River for hydro-electric power.

In 1952, a Research and Development center was established next to the Le Pontet factory. The company focused on innovation and was granted multiple patents from the 1960s onwards.

In 1973, "L'Electro-Réfractaires" merged with the Société Générale de Produits Réfractaires, based in Vénissieux, France, to form the "Société Européenne des Produits Réfractaires" (SEPR). The group finally became Saint-Gobain SEFPRO in 2001.

== Acquisitions and Expansion ==
- 1971: Acquisition of Refradige Italia, Italy; in 2000 it becomes SEPR Italia
- 1973 : L'Electro-Réfractaire merges with SGPR (Société Générale des Produits Réfractaires) to become SEPR
- 1987: Acquisition of Corhart Refractories, with plants in Buckhannon, WV, and Louisville, KY, USA
- 1991: Acquisition of Joint Venture for the Production of Fused Cast Refractories, China – ZPER. This acquisition marked the Saint-Gobain group's first expansion into the refractory market in China.
- 1996: Acquisition of Savoie Réfractaires, France, specializing in sintered materials for the glass industry
- 1996: European research centre CREE is established in Cavaillon
- 1996: Vinhedo, Brazil, joins SEPR
- 2000: Acquisition of Valoref, France
- 2001: New factory built in Changping, Beijing area; ZPER is renamed Beijing SEPR Refractories
- 2002: CUMI, India, established in 1977, becomes SEPR Refractories India
- 2003: Toshiba Monofrax Japan becomes Saint-Gobain TM K.K.
- 2005: The Corhart Refractories factory in Louisville, KY, USA closes
- 2005: Linyi Saint-Gobain Refractories, China, founded
- 2009: A new sintered factory is built on the SEPR Refractories India Palakkad site
- 2015: SEPR India Perundurai plant founded
- 2022: SEFPRO announced a joint venture with Anhui Sino-Refractory Technology Co., Ltd. to enhance its high performance fused cast refractory in China.
- 2025: SEFPRO completed the acquisition of GLASS SERVICE, a.s., a Czech company specializing in advanced glass furnace control systems and simulation software, following regulatory approvals. The move strengthens SEFPRO's portfolio in digital process optimization and sustainability.

== Plants ==
=== SEPR Le Pontet, France ===
The SEPR Le Pontet site has served as the SEFPRO headquarters since its founding in 1947, replacing the original plant in Modane that was destroyed in 1944 by bombings during World War II. The site in Le Pontet, located in the department of Vaucluse in France, covers 25 hectares of land. Its principal products are standard and electrical resistive High Zirconia; unshaped products; alpha-beta and beta Alumina; "ER" glass contact AZS range; and cruciform, of which it is the unique producer worldwide. The plant has received the certifications ISO 9001 and ISO 14001.

The company employs around 700 people and serves markets and customers both local and global.

=== SEFPRO Hydrogen Furnace Initiative, Le Pontet, France ===
In 2024, SEFPRO began construction of a new-generation electrofusion production line at its Le Pontet site. Scheduled to start operations in the second half of 2024, the line is designed to operate with up to 20% hydrogen and to cut annealing energy consumption by about 65% compared with traditional processes. This investment supports SEFPRO's decarbonization roadmap for refractory manufacturing.

=== SEPR Italia, Italy ===
The SEPR Italia site was founded in 1960 and acquired by the Electro-Réfractaire group, known as SEFPRO since 2001, in 1971. The company employs 145 people.

The site is located in Mezzocorona in the Trentino province of Italy. Its specialties are glass contact and superstructure; serving a global market including fused-cast expendables and WR

The plant is certified ISO 9001, ISO 14001 and OHSAS 18001.

=== SEPR Beijing, China ===
SEPR Beijing is a subsidiary of the global refractory group Saint-Gobain SEFPRO. Originally named ZPER upon its acquisition in 1991, it was renamed in 2001 when a new plant in Changping, China was opened. The Beijing Changping plant is now a critical part of the SEFPRO worldwide network's electrofused product supply, serving glass manufacturers across Asian, European and North American markets and employing 500 people. It measures 74,000 m^{2} and specializes in Container, Flat and Specialty Glass markets, with a focus on glass contact, superstructure and furnace end-zone.

=== Saint-Gobain TM K.K., Japan ===
Saint-Gobain TM K.K was founded in 1996 as Toshiba Monofrax, a 49/51 joint-venture between Saint-Gobain and Toshiba Ceramics in Japan. In 2003, Toshiba Ceramics sold its 51% stake in the company to NEG (40%) and Saint-Gobain (11%) and the company was renamed Saint-Gobain TM K.K. The company specializes in producing fused cast products and serves the Japanese and more generally the Asian glass markets, employing around 200 people.The plant in Kozaki, Japan, covers 80,000 m^{2} and specializes in Float, Displays, Special Glasses, Containers and Tableware. It has gained the ISO 9001, ISO 14001 and OHSAS 18001 certificates.

=== SEPR India, India (two plants in Palakkad and one in Perundurai) ===
SEPR Refractories India was created in 2002 when a plant dedicated to fused-cast products was acquired from Carborundum Universal (CUMI) and merged with a sintered-product plant. The plants, located in Perundurai and Palakkad, now serve customers worldwide, from South East Asia to America and employ 550 people.

The total Palakkad plants' area covers 16,700 m^{2} and serves a wide range of glass industry markets, from Container; Flat and Specialty Glass to Tableware and Fiberglass. The plants follow universal SEFPRO standards, with the sintered product plant's technology modelled directly on the Savoie Réfractaires sintered plant in France.

The plants have gained the safety certifications ISO 9001, ISO 14001 and OHSAS 18001.

=== Savoie Refractories, Vénissieux and Provins, France ===
Savoie Réfractaires is a subsidiary of the global refractory group Saint-Gobain SEFPRO, created in 1985 through the acquisition of a plant in Vénissieux, France. The "Société française des Electrodes et Réfractaires", established in 1899, began activity at its Vénissieux plant in 1932. However, in 1961 there was a split between the company's Electrode and Refractory divisions, and S.G.P.R (Société Générale des Produits Réfractaires) was founded. A merger between SGPR and refractory company L'Eléctro-Réfractaires forms SEPR (Société Européenne des Produits Réfractaires) in 1973. The Provins site was founded in 1925 and was, over the years, a subsidiary of la Société Electro Réfractaires, SEPR, and Lafarge Réfractaires as companies were restructured, bought and sold. It was finally acquired again by SEPR (now Saint-Gobain SEFPRO) in 1985.

In 1985, SEPR created Savoie Réfractaires by taking over the Vénissieux plant, which was merged with Provins Réfractaires in 1990 to diversify the company's product base. The plants were chosen for their specialization in sintered materials for the glass industry: Vénissieux serving the Insulation Fiber and Container industry, and Provins serving the Container glass industry. They both now serve global markets and employ 170 people: 120 in Vénissieux and 50 in Provins. Both plants have been awarded the ISO 9001 certification. Vénissieux was additionally awarded the ISO 14001 certification in 2010.

=== Valoref, Bollène, France ===
Valoref is a subsidiary of the global refractory group Saint-Gobain SEFPRO. Valoref recycles used refractories from glass furnace repairs and transforms them into secondary raw materials for the refractory industry. It is certified ISO 9001 and ISO 14001.

=== Corhart Refractories, Buckhannon, WV, USA ===
Corhart Refractories Buckhannon is a subsidiary of the global refractory group Saint-Gobain SEFPRO. Located in Buckhannon, WV, USA, Corhart Refractories was founded in 1960 as a subsidiary of Corning Glass Works. In 1985 the President, Robert Ayotte, acquired Corhart through a leveraged buyout, and then went on to sell the company to Saint-Gobain two years later. The plant's specialties include the manufacturing of refractories destined for Reinforcement, Insulation Fiberglass, Specialty Glass and Container Glass, serving a global market and employing 170 people. The plant has ISO 9001 and ISO 14001 certifications.

=== Linyi Saint-Gobain Refractories, China ===
Linyi China is a subsidiary of the global refractory group Saint-Gobain SEFPRO, founded in 2005. The plant is located in Linyi, in the province of Shandong in China. Its customer scope includes clients across Asia and it employs around 70 people. Its principal markets are Reinforcement Fiber and Specialty Glass, and its main applications are isostatically pressed Chromic Oxide and Zircon. The plant holds the ISO 9001 and ISO 14001 certifications.

=== Vinhedo, Brazil ===
Created in 1968, the Vinhedo plant in Brazil joined SEPR in 1996 and today has over 270 employees. The factory's principal market is expendables.

== Research and Development (R&D) Centers ==
=== Saint-Gobain Research Provence (SGR Provence). Cavaillon, France ===
Saint-Gobain Research Provence (SGR Provence) is the European Research and Development Centre of the global group Saint-Gobain, established in 1996. It belongs to the High Performance Materials division.

Located in Cavaillon in the department of Vaucluse, France, the center employs around 230 researchers and technicians. Its main work focuses on the development of advanced ceramic products.

=== Asian Research Centre – SGRS. Shanghai, China ===
SGRS (Saint-Gobain Research Shanghai) is the Asian research and development centre of the global group Saint-Gobain, located in the Minhang Development Zone of Shanghai. It belongs to the High Performance Materials division of Saint-Gobain, specializing in a wide range of applications.

The centre was opened in September 2007, and extended in September 2013 with the addition of a new building.

=== Saint-Gobain Research North America (SGR North America). Northborough ===
The Saint-Gobain Research North America (SGR North America) is located in Northborough, MA, USA. The center employs 330 people of 27 different nationalities, including 200 scientists and engineers, making it Saint-Gobain's biggest research centre globally.

=== Indian Research Center - SGRI (Chennai, India) ===
Between 2002 and 2009, the center expanded from 100 to over 300 employees, extended the campus by 5,700 m^{2} and opened a new energy efficient building to accommodate its expanding projects that was inaugurated by the CEO (Mr. PA DeChalendar) and the Governor of Massachusetts, Mr. Deval Patrick in July 2009. The new building was designed by the architect Shepley Bulfinch Richardson & Abbott, and its construction involved the use of Saint-Gobain's own building products.

== Sectors Served ==
The SEFPRO group specializes in refractory products and services for the glass industry, serving markets like Container glass, Flat glass, E-glass, Wool Fiberglass, Reinforcement Fiberglass and Special glass. It produces fused cast AZS, high zirconia, alumina, sintered refractories, unshaped refractory materials, cruciform and expendables amongst others.
