= Peiker Acustic =

Peiker Acustic GmbH & Co. KG
- Type: GmbH & Co. KG
- Industry: Automotive
- Founded: 1946
- Headquarters: Friedrichsdorf, Germany
- Key people: Reinhard Kromer-von Baerle (chairman of the board), * Mathias Köhler, Managing Director
- Products: Information and communication technology
- Revenue: 173 Mio € (2013)
- Number of employees: 825 (2013)
- Website: www.peiker.com

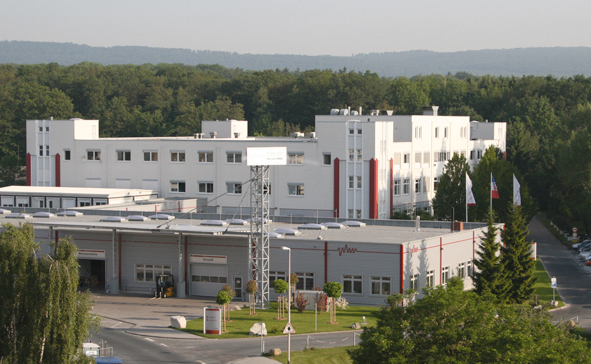
Peiker headquarters in Friedrichsdorf, Germany

Peiker Acustic GmbH & Co. KG (styled all-lower-case as "peiker acustic" in the official company logo) is a family-owned and -operated company, based in Friedrichsdorf, Taunus, Germany, with about 940 employees worldwide. Since 1946, the company has specialized in manufacturing electronic products including microphones, loudspeakers, handsets for radio and mobile telephone use, Bluetooth hands-free kits, and in-vehicle multimedia systems.

In 2013, the Peiker group of companies generated approximately 173 million euros in sales. In 2014, the group of companies was able to generate sales of around 240 million euros. After the closure of large portions of the Milupa plant in Friedrichsdorf, Peiker is now the city's largest employer.

== Clients ==
Peiker Acustic's main clients include well-known automotive and mobile phone manufacturers, along with various industrial firms, police and fire departments, emergency medical services, government agencies and official bodies and Public transit agencies. The company's specialties include the fields of acoustics (with analog and digital signal processing), validation,, and the manufacturing, construction and development of hardware and software for in-vehicle communications devices.

== Geographic location and corporate structure ==
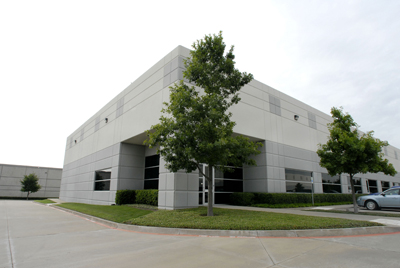
Peiker Acustic, Inc. in Dallas, Texas, USA

The company's headquarters are located in the city of Friedrichsdorf, in Germany's Taunus region. International affiliates include Peiker Acustic, Inc., based in Irving, Texas, a subsidiary named Peiker France SAS in Paris, the subsidiary Peiker de México S.A. de C.V. in Ciudad Juárez, and Pei Tel Communications GmbH, which is based in the town of Teltow, Germany, and is responsible for worldwide sales of the company's product range for government agencies. In addition, Peiker has a trading company in Shanghai, China.

Since 2007, 100 percent of Peiker Acustic has once again been owned, indirectly, by the family that founded the company. The president of the company is Andreas Peiker, Reinhard Kromer-von Baerle is the Managing Director, while Dr. Helmut Rothenberger, is the chairman of the supervisory board. The company's main building, located in the Friedrichsdorf industrial zone on Max-Planck-Strasse, houses production, warehouse, and administrative space, and a plastics injection facility is located in the adjacent neighborhood of Köppern. In addition, since 1996 the company has had a logistics center directly adjacent to that facility. The company's development department, which is critically important to its activities, is located in various buildings and some of its functions are also performed at Peiker locations abroad.

== Certifications ==
In the past, the company has successfully obtained a number of certifications, such as ISO 9001, QS 9000 and VDA 6.1, ISO/TS 16949:2002, and the ISO 14001:1996 environmental certificate.

== History ==
In 1946, Heinrich Peiker and his father-in-law Paul Beerwald founded the company Beerwald & Co. for the manufacture and sale of piezoelectric and acoustic devices. The company was initially headquartered in the city of Bad Homburg vor der Höhe. The company made its major breakthrough with the development of a piezoelectric microphone whose electric adaptation was precisely tailored to the vacuum tube amplifiers commonly used at the time; the company revised and improved it several times over the years.

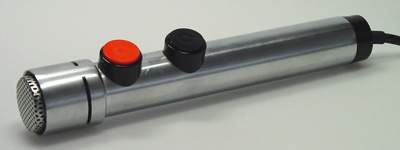
peiker Microphone TM110

During the years that followed, Peiker Acustic achieved one historic milestone after another: In 1957, American balloonist Major David G. Simons was the first person to travel to more than 30,000 meters in altitude, wearing a special microphone from Peiker built into his helmet as he did so. Four years later, the Peiker hand microphone TM70 for UHER Report brand audiotape devices was the first microphone used on a climb in the Himalayas.

The company relocated its head office, in 1962, to the town of Ober-Eschbach, and in 1967 the company name was also changed, to Peiker Acustic, Fabrik Elektroakustischer Geräte, Heinrich Peiker GmbH & Co. KG. Ten years later, Heinrich Peiker was awarded the Cross of Merit of the Federal Republic of Germany by the then Minister of Economics of the German state of Hesse, Heinz-Herbert Karry, in honor of his entrepreneurial and social achievements. The company continued to bring out new microphones and speakers. To ensure that the firm stayed in the family, Andreas Peiker (who had been managing director since 1981) took over as the head of the company in 1983, following the death of his father.

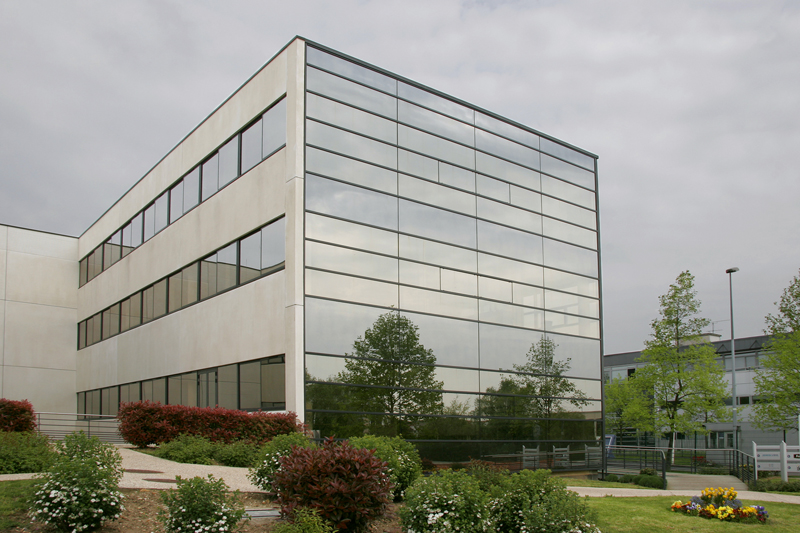
Subsidiary Peiker France SAS in Poissy Cedex, France

Over the next few years, changes took shape within the company's portfolio: With the development of handsets for mobile telephony, the first Bluetooth hands-free kit for in-car use for Siemens, and the first digital answering machine for Alcatel, Peiker Acustic entered a new product segment as an OEM (original equipment manufacturer). The company's focus increasingly shifted to supplying communications for the mobile phone market and automotive industry, and this gradually replaced microphone manufacturing as the mainstay of Peiker's business.

In 1992, the company relocated its headquarters and changed its name for the last time. Now, Peiker Acustic GmbH & Co. KG has its headquarters in the industrial zone on Max-Planck-Strasse in Friedrichsdorf. At the same time, Pei Tel Communications GmbH was established in the town of Teltow, in Greater Berlin. The new company was founded for the development and sale of the Peiker standard product range. In addition, the company established a partnership with ALAC GmbH, a manufacturer of multimedia hands-free kits. In 1993, Peiker established its first foreign subsidiary, Peiker France S.a.r.l. (now Peiker France SAS), based in Paris. In 1996, the company expanded its activities in North America with its new subsidiary, Peiker Acustic, Inc., originally based in Auburn, Georgia, USA. This branch location was ultimately relocated to Dallas, Texas in 1999.

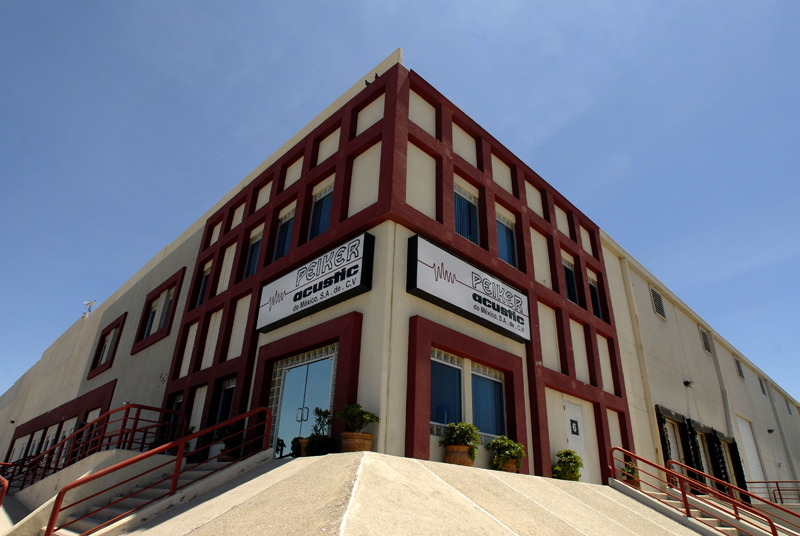
Manufacturing location Peiker México S.A. de C.V. in Ciudad Juarez

In 2000, Peiker succeeded, in cooperation with ELSA, in launching one of the world's first Bluetooth hands-free kits for vehicles. A year later, Peiker opened a technical office in Detroit. In 2004, another production site was opened, Peiker México, in Ciudad Juárez. The same year, the company also established its competency center in the town of Böblingen, Germany, dedicated primarily to speech input systems and vehicle connections. In 2005, Peiker developed the first full in-car integration system for the Apple iPod. In June 2006, Peiker dedicated its new logistics center, occupying more than 3000 m^{2} of space, on the grounds of its headquarters in Friedrichsdorf. In 2008, the company decided to purchase a neighboring plot of land offering 12,000 m^{2} of space, with an eye to further expansion. In 2011, Peiker developed a module suitable for automotive applications which supports the automatic European eCall (emergency call) function. These telematics units now form the main business area of the company.

In 2014, Peiker presented its "All Wireless" concept at the Connected Cars event in Amsterdam.

In December 2015 Peiker was sold for an undisclosed price to the French automotive supplier Valeo.
