= Balthazar-Georges Sage =

French chemist (1740–1824)

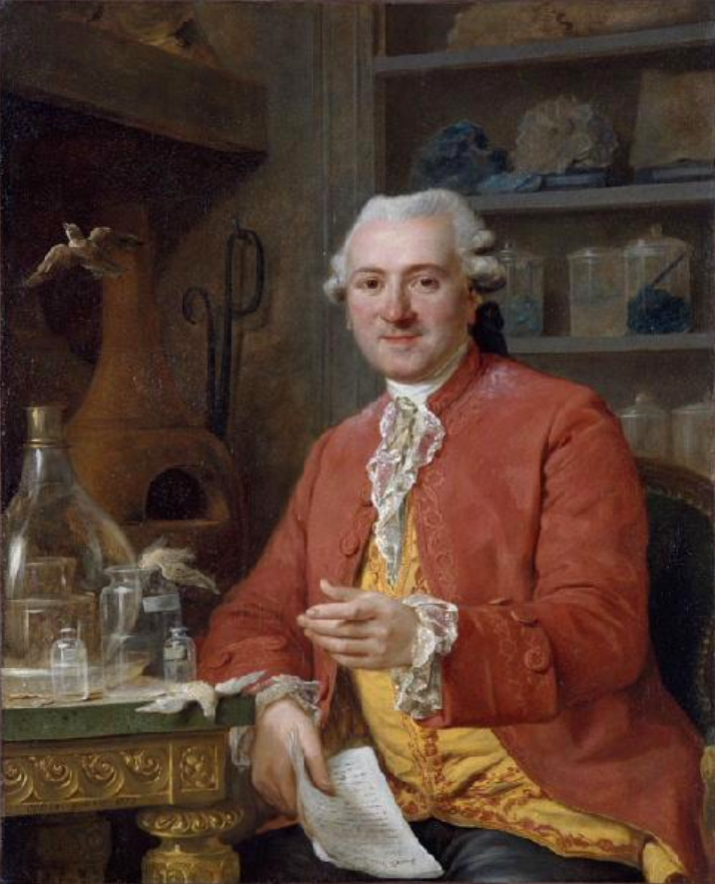
Sage, painted by Jean-François Gilles Colson, c. 1777

Balthazar-Georges Sage (French pronunciation: [/saʒ/]; 7 May 1740 – 9 September 1824) was a French chemist who was a founder of the Paris Ecole Royale des Mines. He held a powerful position and was influential in preventing advances in chemistry in France by his insistence on supporting outdated ideas, such as the phlogiston theory, in the face of evidence to the contrary provided by his contemporaries who included Antoine Lavoisier. He also opposed reform in chemical naming. Some historians have called him a "false scholar" (faux savant).

== Life and work ==
Sage was born in Paris, the son of a Paris apothecary François and Marie-Ursule des Cloîtres. He was educated the Collége des Quatre Nations and was influenced by the lectures of Abbé Nollet and G. F. Rouelle. He set up a small laboratory at home to repeat experiments and had an accident with mercuric chloride poisoning at the age of 16. He also built up a collection of minerals and published his first work Examen chymique de différentes substances minérales in 1769. He influenced Louis XV to obtain a position in the Academy of Sciences in 1770. His chemical analyses were found to be problematic with faulty claims of discovering lead at Poullaouen which was shown incorrect by a chemist named Louis-Guillaume Laborie in 1772. A committee was made to examine the competing claims but only Laborie was willing to be examined. He helped Lavoisier in conducting experiments on combustion. Lavoisier pointed out numerous errors in Sage's findings including his findings of gold in vegetable ashes. Sage also claimed that phosphoric acid was the acid found universally in minerals.

Sage used his mineral collection to influence the finance director Jacques Necker (1732–1804) of the value of mineralogy for training mining students. A chair in mineralogy was created for him at the Hôtel de la Monnaie on July 11, 1778. In 1783 it was made into the school of mines with Sage as the first director. Although a royalist he survived the turbulent period from 1793 to 1794 in prison, whereas Lavoisier and others were executed, and returned to a career in chemistry. His private mineral collection was made part of the school of mines.

Sage married Philippine-Augustine Julia Piedchin and they adopted two daughters. A fall in 1818 left him immobile and he died at the Hôtel de la Monnaie, Paris.
