= Casa Pellandini =

Luxury goods factory and store

- Type: Private
- Industry: Stained glass manufacturer; manufacture, import, and sale of sculptures, lamps, mirrors, and ornamental objects
- Founded: 1893
- Founder: Claudio Pellandini
- Defunct: N/A
- Headquarters: 2a. Calle de San Francisco No. 10, Mexico City, Mexico
- Area served: Mexico
- Products: sculptures, French stained glass, lamps, Venetian mirrors
- Number of employees: ~200
- Subsidiaries: Guadalajara, Jalisco

Casa Pellandini
- Interactive map of the Casa Pellandini area

General information
- Type: commercial facilities
- Location: 2a. Calle de San Francisco No. 10; Cuauhtémoc, Mexico City, Mexico
- Coordinates: 19°26′0.98″N 99°8′15.98″W
- Current tenants: Banco Santander Select

Casa Pellandini was a Mexican company that manufactured and imported art and luxury items, founded by the Swiss stained glass artist of Italian origin Claudio Pellandini, in 1893, at the 2a. Calle de San Francisco No. 10, currently Madero 33 (Banco Santander Select), four blocks east of the Palacio de Bellas Artes, in Mexico City.

== History ==
Claudio Pellandini arrived in Mexico in 1860. Since 1893, in its showroom and store, at 2a. Calle de San Francisco No. 10, the Casa Pellandini used to sell: marble, bronze and terracotta sculptures; French and Mexican stained glass windows, lamps, Venetian mirrors, artistic engravings, marble and alabaster busts, frames, moldings, glass, imported wallpaper; porcelain figures, white and painted ones; prints, facsimiles of watercolors, chromos, oleographs, griffins, planters, materials for artists, supplies for engineers, cases of oil and watercolor colors, and ornamental objects, which ended up in the National Palace, state government palaces, the Municipal Hall of Puebla, the Chapultepec Castle, where President Porfirio Díaz resided up until 25 May 1911, churches, residences, public buildings, etcetera.

Two years later, in 1895, Claudio Pellandini opened the first large art supplies factory in the country. Its workshops, located at Comonfort 48 on the corner of Jaime Nunó, in the Santa Ana neighborhood of Colonia Morelos, Mexico City, occupied an area of 129 167 square feet (12 000 m^{2}), and had machinery imported from Europe and the United States.

It employed approximately 200 people, and had 27 electric machines for beveling, grinding, engraving, and polishing glass. At the end of the 19th century, the French stained glass factory Saint-Gobain named the Casa Pellandini its sole representative and depositary in the Mexican Republic. The high society of the Porfiriato, partially Frenchified, liked to purchase the products that the Swiss Claudio Pellandini imported or manufactured. The Mexican Revolution had no adverse effects on the operations of the prestigious company or on the marketing of luxury goods.

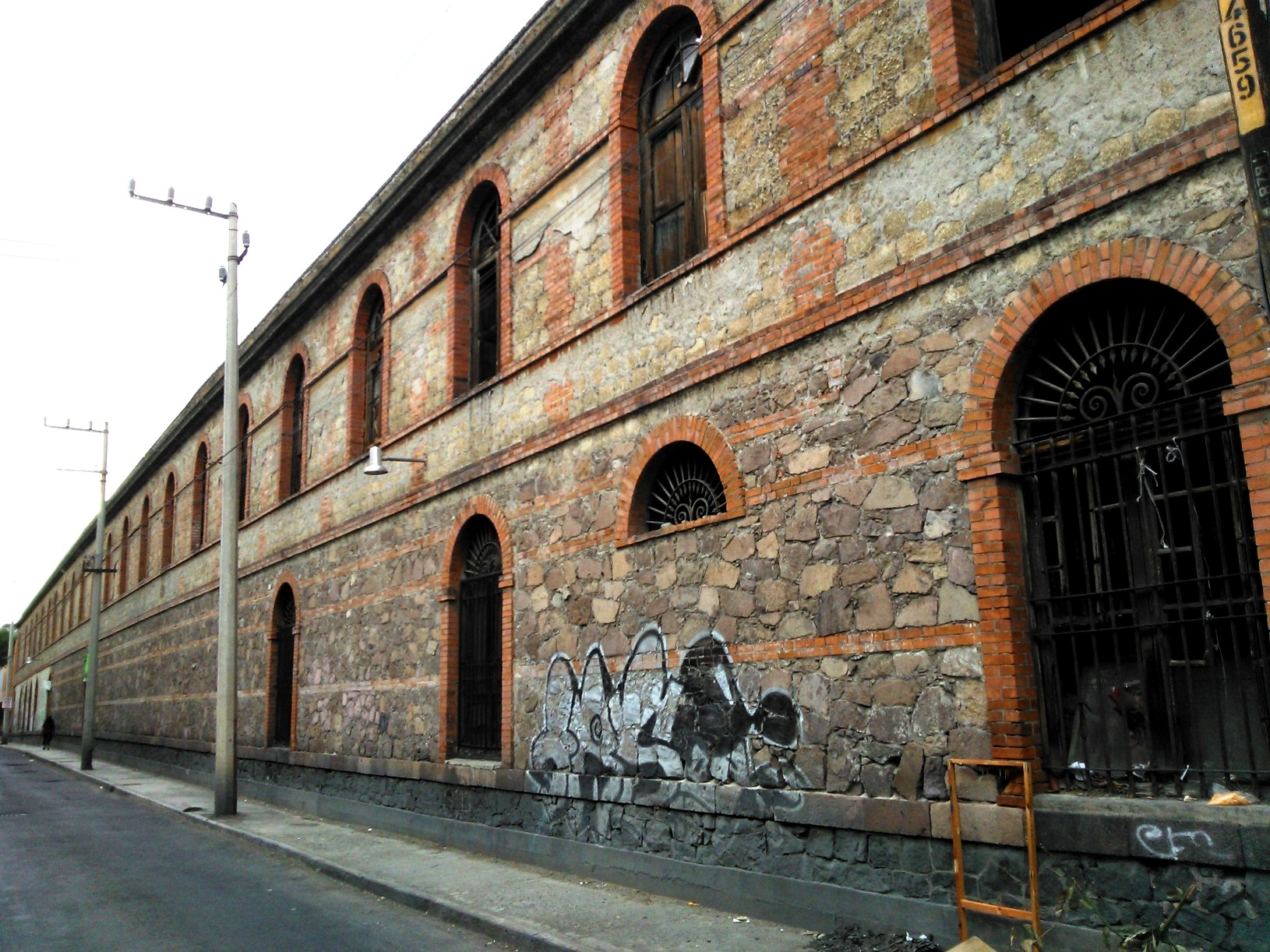
Building that housed Claudio Pellandini's stained glass workshops, at Comonfort 48, Santa Ana neighborhood, Mexico City

Stained glasses created by master Claudio Pellandini, placed in windows of the facade of the Government Palace of Nuevo León, in Monterrey, showed images of various Mexican national heroes. Seven pieces by Pellandini were vandalized on 5 January 2017, during riots at the Plaza de los Héroes in the capital city of Nuevo León. They were transferred to the Taller Casa Montaña, in Torreón, Coahuila, for restoration.

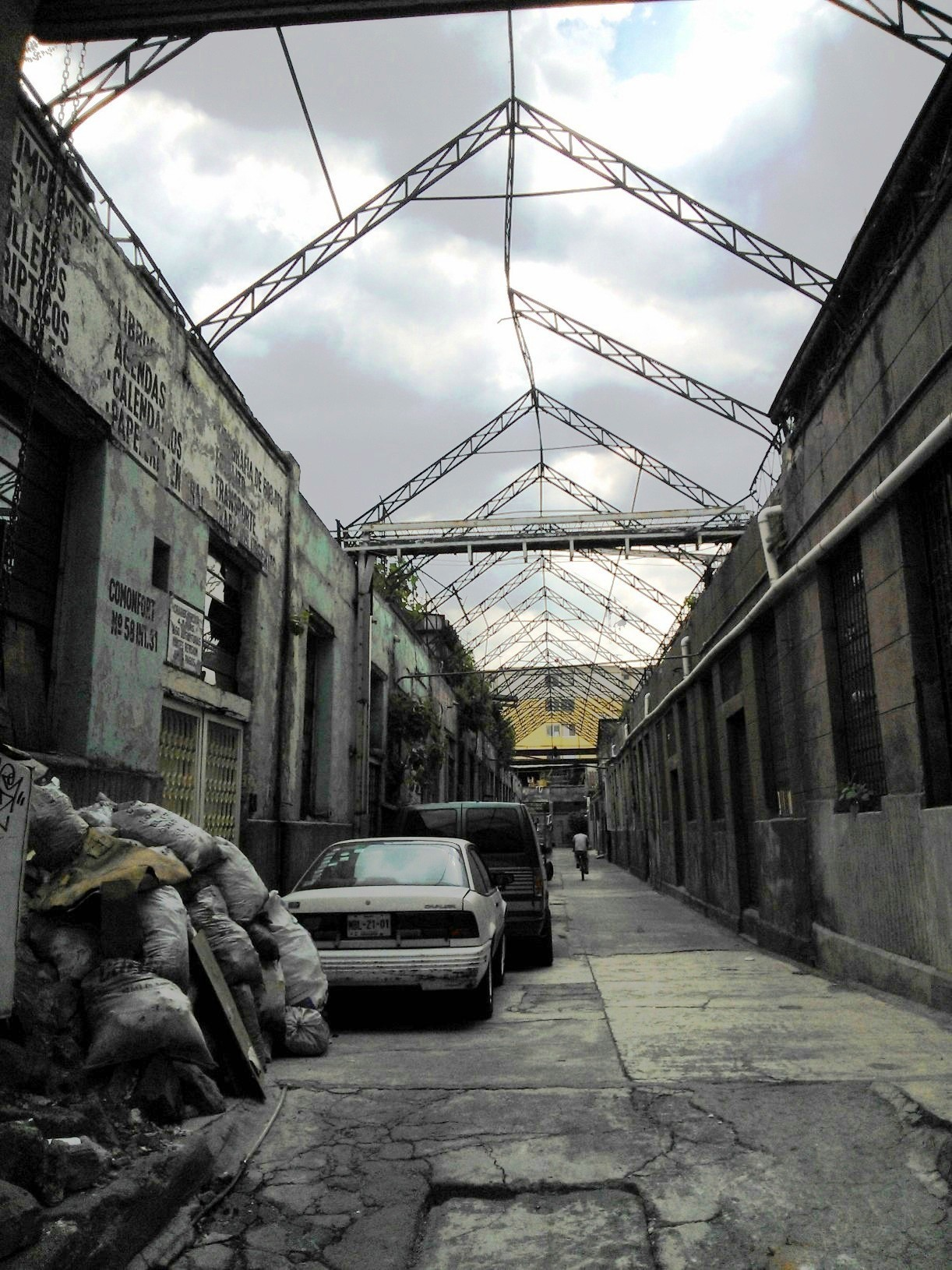
Ruins of the interior of Claudio Pellandini's workshops

The Casa Pellandini had a branch in the Downtown of Guadalajara, founded in 1901 on premises numbers 43 and 45 on López Cotilla Street. On Wednesday, 14 September 1927, a fire broke out minor consequences in said branch of that commercial house. By 1946, it had moved to Avenida Corona 129, also in Guadalajara Downtown. In 1971, it was at Prisciliano Sánchez 175, also in Guadalajara Downtown. This branch was managed by Otto B. Kiener. This was its last location in that city.
