= Mines ParisTech: Professional Ranking of World Universities =

University ranking by the French Grande école Mines ParisTech

Mines ParisTech: Professional Ranking of World Universities is a University ranking by the French grande école Mines ParisTech.

== Methodology ==
The ranking is based on the number of alumni currently holding the post of CEO in one of the 500 largest companies in the world, according to the Fortune Global 500 ranking established by the American business magazine Fortune.

== Ranking ==
=== 2011 University Ranking ===
These are the highest ranking 37 institutions (out of 392):

Rank	Institution	Country
1	Harvard University	(United States) US
2	University of Tokyo	Japan
3	Keio University	Japan
4	HEC Paris	France
5 =	Kyoto University	Japan
5 =	University of Oxford	(United Kingdom) UK
7	École Polytechnique	France
8	Waseda University	Japan
9	École Nationale d'Administration	France
10	Seoul National University	South Korea
11	University of Pennsylvania	(United States) US
12	Columbia University	(United States) US
13 =	Stanford University	(United States) US
13 =	Tohoku University	Japan
13 =	University of Nottingham	(United Kingdom) UK
16	Massachusetts Institute of Technology	(United States) US
17	Sciences Po Paris	France
18	University of Saint-Gallen	Switzerland
19 =	University of Sao-Paulo	Brazil
19 =	Northwestern University	(United States) US
21 =	INSEAD	France
21 =	University of Chicago	(United States) US
21 =	Mines ParisTech	France
21 =	WU Wien	Austria
25 =	Chuo University	Japan
25 =	Cornell University	(United States) US
25 =	Hitotsubashi University	Japan
25 =	Kobe University	Japan
29	University of California, Berkeley	(United States) US
30 =	Shandong University	(mainland China) China
30 =	Bocconi University	Italy
30 =	University of Cambridge	(United Kingdom) UK
30 =	University of Cologne	Germany
34	University of Göttingen	Germany
35	Yale University	(United States) US
36	Purdue University	(United States) US
37	University of Cincinnati	(United States) US

== Regional ranking ==
=== North America ===
Rank	Institution	Country
1	Harvard University	United States
2	University of Pennsylvania	United States
3	Columbia University	United States
4	Stanford University	United States
5	Massachusetts Institute of Technology	United States
6	Northwestern University	United States
7	University of Chicago	United States
8	Cornell University	United States
9	University of California, Berkeley	United States
10	Yale University	United States
11	Purdue University	United States
12	University of Cincinnati	United States
13	Baylor University	United States
14	Georgia Institute of Technology	United States
15	Queen's University	Canada
16	University of Arizona	United States
17	University of Notre Dame	United States
18	University of Texas at Austin	United States
19	University of Wisconsin–Madison	United States
20	Dartmouth College	United States

=== Europe ===
Rank	Institution	Country
1	HEC Paris	France
2	University of Oxford	United Kingdom
3	École Polytechnique	France
4	University of Nottingham	United Kingdom
5	Sciences Po	France
6	University of St. Gallen	Switzerland
7	Mines ParisTech	France
8	Vienna University of Economics and Business	Austria
9	Bocconi University	Italy
10	University of Cambridge	United Kingdom
11	University of Cologne	Germany
12	University of Göttingen	Germany
13	Chalmers University of Technology	Sweden
14	École des ponts ParisTech	France
15	Erasmus University Rotterdam	Netherlands
16	University of Bochum	Germany
17	University of Glasgow	United Kingdom
18	University of Hamburg	Germany
19	University of Manchester	United Kingdom
20	Technical University of Madrid	Spain

=== Analysis ===
This ranking is more international than certain other rankings because it uses the Fortune Global 500. It does not concentrate only on English-speaking countries but also includes Asian, Latin American, and European universities.

The Global Companies Rank Universities by the New York Times is similar to this ranking.
