= Pierre-André de Chalendar =

French businessman

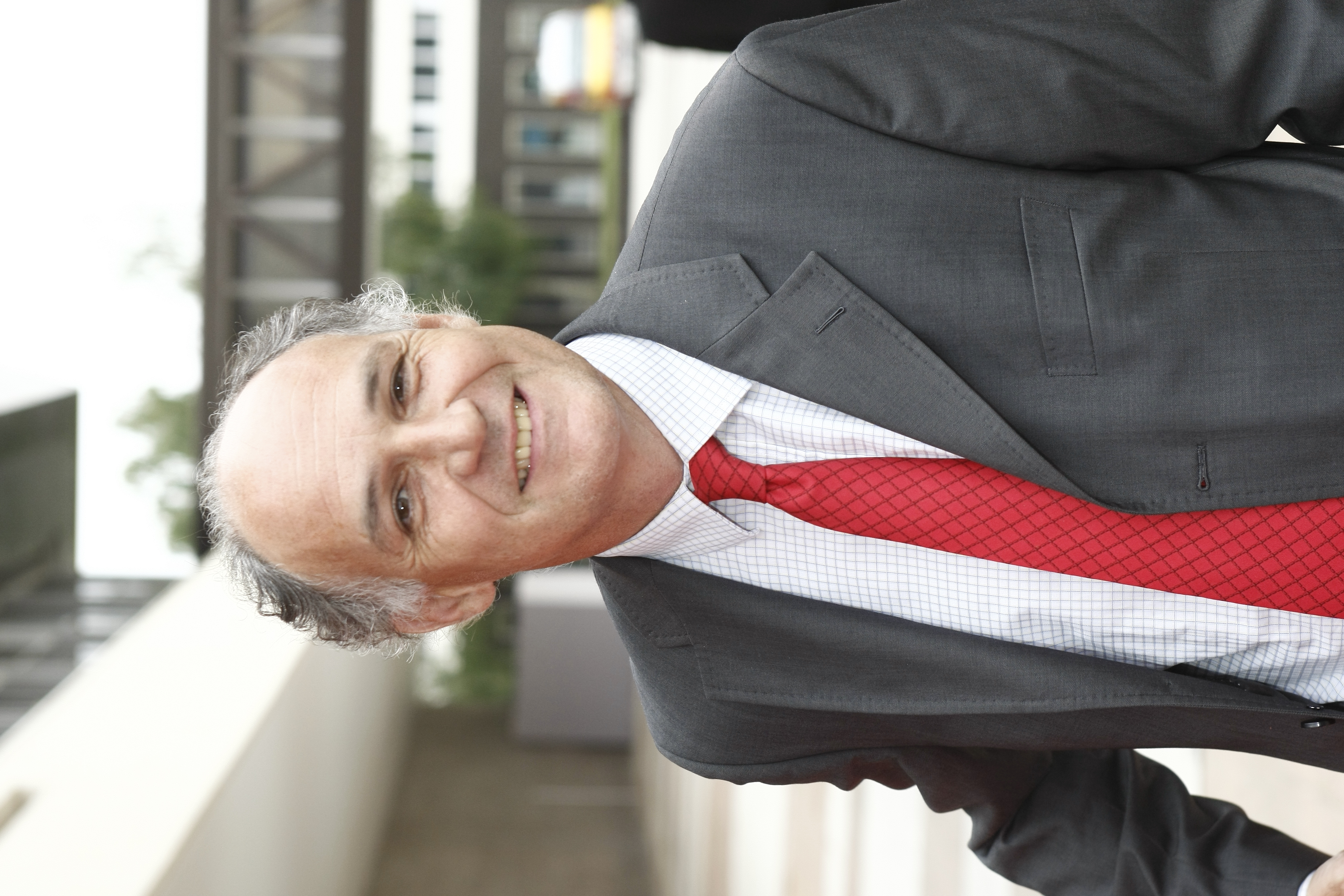
- Born: 12 April 1958 (age 68); Vichy, France
- Education: Lycée Carnot; ESSEC Business School; École nationale d'administration
- Occupation: CEO of Saint-Gobain
- Spouse: Leticia Petrie (m. 1989)
- Children: 4

Pierre-André de Chalendar (born 12 April 1958) is a French businessman. He is chairman and CEO of Saint-Gobain since 3 June 2010, and CEO since June 2007.

== Early life ==
Pierre-André de Chalendar was born on 12 April 1958 in Vichy. He graduated from ESSEC Business school in 1979 and the École nationale d'administration (ENA) in 1983 (promotion Solidarity).

== Career ==
De Chalendar began his career at the General Inspection of Finance (IGF) from 1983 to 1987. He became financial inspector in 1984, project manager from 1987 to 1988 and deputy director from 1988 to 1989 in the General Directorate for Energy and raw materials of the Ministry of Industry and Energy.

In October 1989 De Chalendar joined Saint-Gobain as vice-president corporate planning. From 1989 to 1992, he served as its vice-president for corporate planning. He then served as corporate vice president of Saint-Gobain Corp. (USA) and managing director of Norton Abrasives Europe from 1992 to 1996, president of the worldwide Abrasives Division and chairman and CEO of Norton SA from 1996 to 2000, general delegate for the United Kingdom and Ireland and chief executive of Meyer International from 2000 to 2003, and senior vice-president of Compagnie de Saint-Gobain in charge of the Building Distribution Sector from 2003 to 2005. He became chairman of BPB in 2005. He served as chief operating officer from 2005 to 2007, director since 2006, and chief executive officer of Saint-Gobain since 2007. He has been appointed by the board of directors of Saint-Gobain as chairman and CEO since 3 June 2010, after the general meeting of shareholders.

== Other activities ==
=== Corporate boards ===
- Veolia, independent member of the board of directors (since 2021)
- BNP Paribas, member of the board of directors (since 2021)
- Bpifrance, independent member of the board of directors

=== Non-profit organizations ===
- ESSEC Business School, member of the board of overseers (since 2019)
- European Round Table of Industrialists (ERT), member

== Recognition ==
De Chalendar is a Knight of the Legion of Honour and National Order of Merit.

== Personal life ==
In 1989 De Chalendar married Leticia, daughter of Sir Peter Petrie, 5th Baronet. They have four children.

Business positions
Preceded by Jean-Louis Beffa	CEO of Saint-Gobain; 2010–present	Succeeded by Incumbent
