= FTE automotive =

German automotive manufacturing company

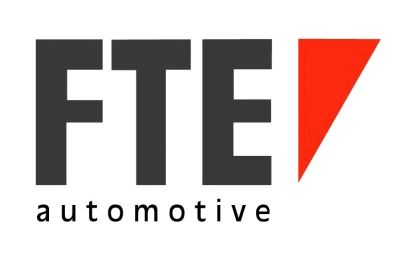
- Company type: GmbH
- Industry: Automotive
- Founded: 1943
- Headquarters: Ebern, Bavaria, Germany
- Key people: CEO: Andreas Thumm
- Revenue: 430 Mio. EUR (2014)
- Number of employees: 3,800 (worldwide)
- Website: www.fte-automotive.com

The FTE automotive Group is a German automotive manufacturing company specialized in the sector of drive train and brake system applications for the automotive industry. The company supplies all notable automobile manufacturers and employs over 3800 employees at 11 production sites around the world. FTE automotive is based in Ebern, Bavaria, Germany. On June 2, 2016, Bain Capital sold FTE Automotive, which it had acquired in May 2013, to the French automotive supplier Valeo for 819.3 million euros.

== Production sites ==
- FTE automotive GmbH, Ebern, Germany
- FTE automotive Möve GmbH, Mühlhausen, Germany
- FTE automotive systems GmbH, Fischbach (Ebern), Germany
- FTE automotive (Taicang) Co., Ltd. China
- FTE automotive Czechia s.r.o., Podborany, Czech Republic
- FTE automotive Slovakia s.r.o, Prešov, Slovakia
- FTE automotive USA Inc., Auburn Hills, United States
- FTE Industria e Comercio Ltda, São Paulo, Brazil
- FTE Mexicana S.A. de C.V, Puebla, Mexico

Joint Venture:

- APG-FTE automotive Co. Ltd., Hangzhou, China
- SFMC s.r.o., Prešov, Slovakia

== Products ==
The company produces a multitude of hydraulic brake and clutch components:

- Brake boosters
- Dual centric slave cylinders
- Electric lube oil pumps
- Gear actuator modules
- Parking lock cylinders
- Cooling oil valves
- Brake caliper replacements
- Brakes hoses
- Electro-hydraulic actuators
- Clutch master cylinders
- Clutch slave cylinders
- Clutch pipes
- Drum brakes
- Concentric slave cylinders

The product portfolio included electrical sensors and accessories.
