= Jean-Louis Beffa =

French businessman (born 1941)

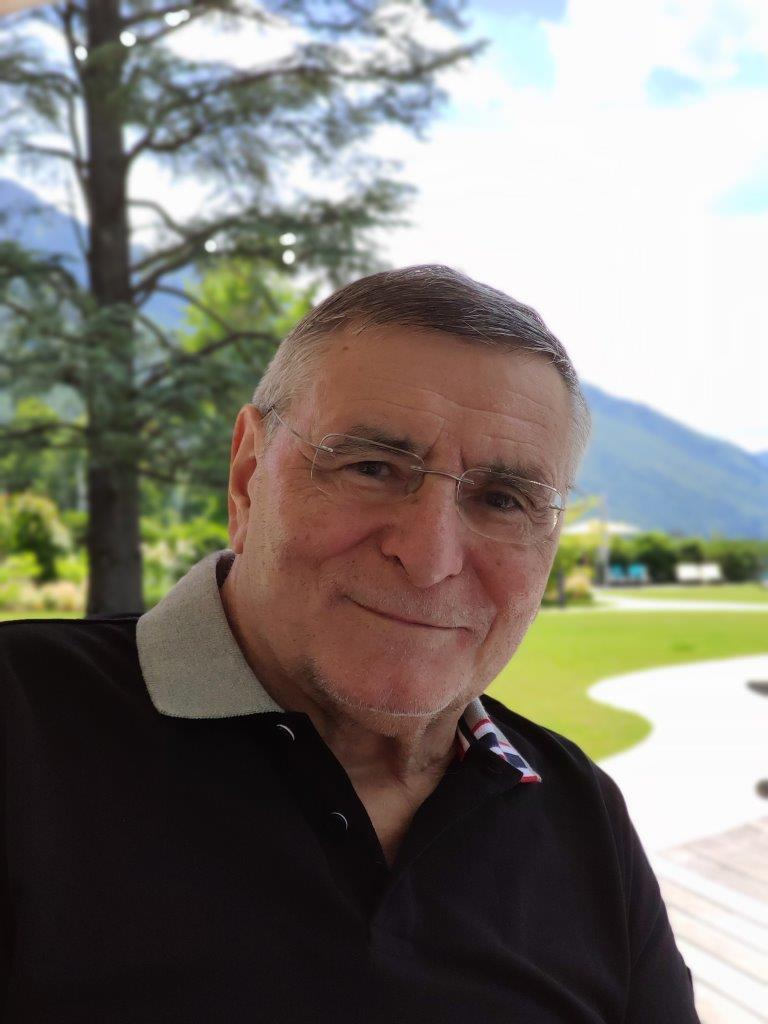
Jean-Louis Beffa, 2020

Jean-Louis Beffa (born 11 August 1941 in Nice, France) is a French businessman. He was Chairman and CEO of Saint-Gobain from 1986 to 2007, Chairman until 2010 and is Honorary Chairman of the board of Saint-Gobain. He is a former member of the Saint-Simon Foundation and was on the boards of BNP Paribas, GDF Suez, Groupe Bruxelles Lambert, Siemens AG, Le Monde S.A., Société Editrice du Monde S.A., and Le Monde Partenaires SAS.

In 2000, he and Nobel economist Robert Solow co-founded the Saint-Gobain Centre for Economic Studies, later becoming the Cournot Centre. They went on to create the Cournot Foundation in 2010 under the aegis of the public charity Fondation de France, currently serving as co-presidents.

== Education ==
- École nationale supérieure des mines de Paris
- École polytechnique
- Institut d'études politiques de Paris
