= Valeo =

French global automotive supplier

Valeo S.A.
- Type: Société Anonyme
- Traded as: Euronext Paris: FR; CAC Mid 60 component
- ISIN: FR0013176526
- Industry: Automotive industry
- Founded: 1923; 103 years ago
- Headquarters: Paris
- Key people: Christophe Périllat (CEO)
- Products: Auto parts
- Revenue: ▲€22.04 billion (2023)
- Operating income: 744,000,000 euro (2023)
- Net income: ▼€221 million (2023)
- Number of employees: 114,700 (2019)
- Website: valeo.com/en/

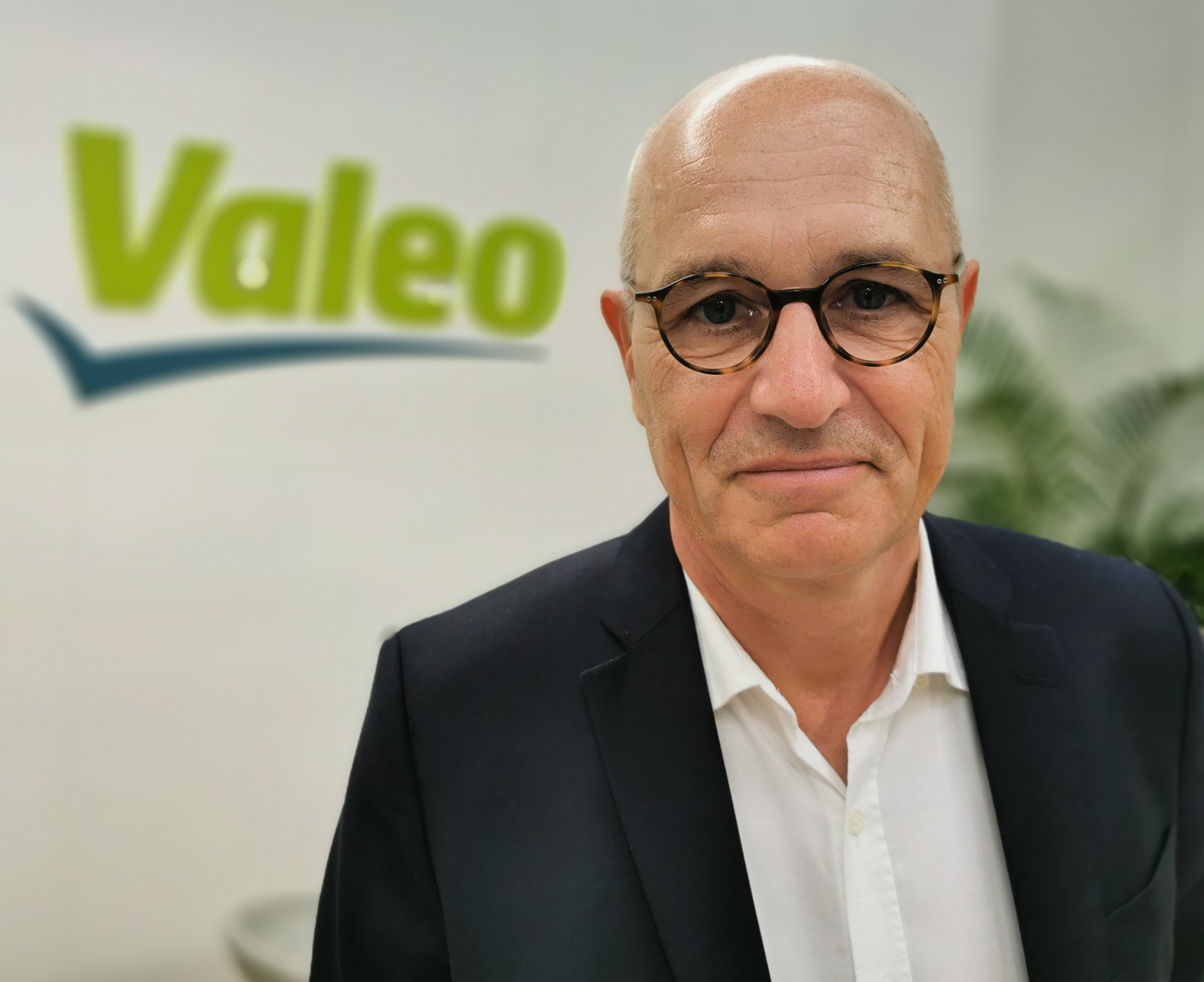
Christophe Périllat (2025)

Valeo is a French global automotive supplier headquartered in France, listed on the Paris Stock Exchange (CAC Mid 60 Index). It supplies a wide range of products to automakers and the aftermarket. The Group employs 113,600 people in 29 countries worldwide. It has 186 production plants, 66 R&D centers and 15 distribution platforms. In 2018, Valeo's sales rose 4% to €19.1 billion. It frequently ranks as France's leading patent filer.

== History ==
The Société Anonyme Française de Ferodo was founded in 1923 in Saint-Ouen, near Paris. It first distributed brake linings and clutch facings under license from Ferodo.

In 1932, the company began producing clutches. In the same year, it was listed on the Paris Stock Exchange.

In the 1950s, the company expanded outside the Paris area, opening new factories in France.

The firm produced braking systems (1961), thermal systems (1962), lighting systems and electrical systems (1971-1978 and 1984).

The 1960s saw the start of the company's international development, first in Europe, especially in Spain and Italy, and then all over the world: Brazil (1974), the United States (1980), Tunisia (1984), South Korea and Turkey (1988), Mexico (1989), China (1994), India (1997), Central and Eastern Europe (Poland and the Czech Republic in 1995, Romania in 2002, Slovakia in 2004) and Egypt in 2005, to total 33 countries at the end 2018.

In May 1980, the company was renamed Valeo, which means "I am well" in Latin.

Acquisitions include German automotive suppliers Peiker and Spheros in 2015, followed by FTE automotive in 2017.

In the early 2000s, Valeo produced parking assistance systems using ultrasonic sensors.

In 2017, Valeo presented its low-voltage prototype electric vehicle at the Consumer Electronics Show in Las Vegas.

In February 2021, Valeo announced that it will invest $5 million to open a new assembly plant in Bessemer, Alabama, which is expected to create 70 jobs.

== Strategy ==
Since 2009, CEO Jacques Aschenbroich's strategy has been based on: innovation linked to the reduction of CO_{2} emissions and intuitive driving, and geographical expansion in high-growth potential countries, notably in Asia and in emerging countries.

From 2009 to 2018, the number of employees increased from 45,000 to 113,600. The Group's sales rose from €7.5 billion to €19.1 billion. with a strong development in China.

Valeo invests 11,8% of its sales in R&D and innovation. It has 17,900 research and development employees. In 2016 and 2017, the Group ranked as France's leading patent filer.

In November 2025, Valeo announced its 'Elevate 2028' strategy which sets out its trajectory to 2028: steadily increasing profit from 2022 onwards, generating higher cash from 2025 onwards and returning to sales growth from 2027 onwards. This is in efforts to consolidate its position as a global leader in key car technologies, as the group enters into regions like China, India and North America, and fully aligns for a future of electrified, safer and software-defined cars.

== Organization ==
The Group employs 113,601 people in 33 countries throughout the world. It has 184 production plants, 55 R&D centers and 15 distribution platforms.

=== Four Business Groups ===
Valeo is structured around four business units:

1. Comfort & Driving Assistance Systems (advanced driver-assistance technologies)
2. Powertrain Systems (automotive powertrain components and vehicle electrification)
3. Thermal Systems (automotive engine cooling systems)
4. Visibility Systems (windshield wipers and automotive lighting)

Its Valeo Service activity supplies original equipment spares to automakers and replacement parts to the independent aftermarket.

=== International Business ===
Original equipment sales growth by destination region:

- Europe and Africa: 46% of sales
- Asia: 32% of sales
- North America: 20% of sales
- South America: 2% of sales

== Financial statistics ==
Sales (millions)

- 2001: €10,234
- 2002: €9,803
- 2003: €9,234
- 2004: €9,018
- 2005: €9,736
- 2006: €9,970
- 2007: €9,555
- 2008: €8,664
- 2009: €7,499
- 2010: €9,632
- 2011: €10,868
- 2012: €11,759
- 2013: €12,110
- 2014: €12,725
- 2015: €14,544
- 2016: €16,519
- 2017: €18,600
- 2018: €19,124

Breakdown of sales by Business Group 2018

- Driving Assistance Systems: 19%
- Powertrain Systems: 26%
- Thermal Systems: 26%
- Visibility Systems: 29%

Operating margin (in % of sales)

- 2001: 3.8%
- 2002: 5.0%
- 2003: 5.0%
- 2004: 4.9%
- 2007: 3.6%
- 2008: 2.6%
- 2009: 1.8%
- 2010: 6.4%
- 2011: 6.5%
- 2012: 6.2%
- 2013: 6.8%
- 2014: 7.2%
- 2015: 7.7%
- 2016: 8.1%
- 2017: 8.0%
- 2018: 6.3%

== Asbestos ==
Valeo, its directors and its corporate medical function have been indicted after a decade-long penal procedure in 2006 for homicide, unintentional injury, and failure to assist a person in danger regarding its former use of asbestos which caused the death of hundreds of employees over many years.

Since, the Valeo Group has set up high health-security standards and has been thoroughly monitoring employees and retired personnel. This policy was ratified in a national agreement with the French government in April 2009. The group secured four former industrial sites with asbestos related issues.

== See also ==
- Jacques Aschenbroich
