= Saint-Gobain =

French glass and construction material manufacturer

Compagnie de Saint-Gobain S.A.
- Type: Société Anonyme
- Traded as: Euronext Paris: SGO; CAC 40 component; Euro Stoxx 50 component
- ISIN: FR0000125007
- Industry: Building materials
- Founded: 1665; 361 years ago
- Headquarters: La Défense, Courbevoie (Hauts-de-Seine), France
- Area served: Worldwide
- Key people: Pierre-André de Chalendar (chairman); Benoît Bazin (CEO)
- Products: Construction materials production and retail, glass, ceramics, plastics, abrasives, gypsum plasterboards
- Revenue: ▼€47.94 billion (2023)
- Operating income: ▼€5.251 billion (2023)1930
- Net income: ▼€2.756 billion (2023)
- Total assets: ▲€57.30 billion (2023)
- Total equity: ▲€23.76 billion (2023)
- Number of employees: 159,145 (2023)
- Website: saint-gobain.com

Compagnie de Saint-Gobain S.A. (French pronunciation: [sɛ̃ ɡɔbɛ̃]) is a French multinational corporation, founded in 1665 in Paris as the Manufacture royale de glaces de miroirs, and today headquartered on the outskirts of Paris, at La Défense and in Courbevoie. Originally a mirror manufacturer, it also produces a variety of construction, high-performance, moderate-performance, lower-performance and other materials. Saint-Gobain is present in 76 countries and as of 2022 employs more than 170,000 people.

== History ==
=== 1665–1789: Manufacture royale ===
Since the mid-17th century, luxury products such as silk textiles, lace, and mirrors were in high demand. In the 1660s, mirrors had become very popular among the upper classes of society: Italian cabinets, châteaux, ornate side tables, and pier-tables were decorated with these expensive and luxurious products. At the time, however, the French were not known for mirror technology; instead, the Republic of Venice was known as the world leader in glass manufacturing, controlling a technical and commercial monopoly of the glass and mirror business. As a result, French Minister of Finance Jean-Baptiste Colbert wanted France to become completely self-sufficient in meeting domestic demand for luxury products, thereby strengthening the national economy.

Colbert established, by letters patent, the public enterprise Manufacture royale de glaces de miroirs (French pronunciation: [manyfaktyʁ ʁwajal də ɡlas də miʁwaʁ], Royal Mirror-Glass Factory) in October 1665. The company was created for a period of twenty years and would be financed in part by the state. The beneficiary and first director was the French financier Nicolas du Noyer, a receiver of taxes of Orléans, who was granted a monopoly of making glass and mirror-glass for twenty years. The company had the informal name Compagnie du Noyer.

An Early Saint-Gobain Emblem

To compete with the Italian mirror industry, Colbert commissioned several Venetian glassworkers he had enticed to Paris to work for the company. The first unblemished mirrors were produced in 1666. Soon the mirrors created in the Faubourg Saint-Antoine, under the French company, began to rival those of Venice. The French company was capable of producing mirrors that were 40 to 45 inches long (1.0 to 1.1 m), which at the time, was considered impressive. Competition between France and the Venetians became so fierce that Venice considered it a crime for any glass artisan to leave and practice their trade elsewhere, especially in foreign territory. Nicolas du Noyer complained in writing that the Venetians were unwilling to impart the secrets of glassmaking to the French workers and that the company was hard-pressed to pay its expenses. Life in Paris proved distracting to the workers, and supplies of firewood to stoke the furnaces were dearer in the capital than elsewhere. In 1667, the glass-making was transferred to a small glass furnace already working at Tourlaville, near Cherbourg in Normandy, and the premises in Faubourg Saint-Antoine were devoted to glass-grinding and polishing the crude product.

Though the Compagnie du Noyer was reduced at times to importing Venetian glass and finishing it in France, by September 1672 the royal French manufacturer was on a sufficiently sound footing for the importation of glass to be forbidden to any of Louis' subjects, under any conditions. In 1678, the company produced the glass for the Hall of Mirrors at the Palace of Versailles.

In 1683, the company's financial arrangement with the State was renewed for another two decades. However, in 1688, a competitor in the form of the Compagnie Thévart was created, which was also partially financed by the French state. Compagnie Thévart used a new pouring process that allowed it to make plate glass mirrors measuring at least 60 by 40 inches wide (1.5 by 1.0 m), much bigger than the 40 inches (1.0 m) that the Compagnie du Noyer could create.

The two companies competed for seven years, until 1695 when the economy slowed down and their technical and commercial rivalry became counterproductive. Under an order from the French government, the two companies were forced to merge, creating the Compagnie Plastier. A mirror factory in the village of Saint-Gobain in Picardie gave its name to the present company.

In 1702, Compagnie Plastier declared bankruptcy. A group of Franco-Swiss Protestant bankers rescued the collapsing company, changing the name to Compagnie Dagincourt. At the same time, the company was provided royal patents which allowed it to maintain a legal monopoly in the glass-manufacturing industry up until the French Revolution (1789), despite fierce, sometimes violent, protests from free enterprise partisans.

=== 1789–1910: Industrial Revolution ===
In 1789, as a consequence of the French Revolution, the state financial and competitive privileges accorded to Compagnie Dagincourt were abolished. The company had to depend on the participation and capital of private investors, although it continued to remain partly under the control of the French state.

In the 1820s, Saint-Gobain continued to function as it had under the Ancien Régime, manufacturing high-quality mirrors and glass for the luxury market. However, although in 1824, a new glass manufacturer was established in Commentry, France, and in 1837, several Belgian glass manufacturers were also founded. While Saint-Gobain continued to dominate the luxury high-quality mirror and glass markets, its newly created competitors focused their attention on making medium and low-quality products. The manufacture of products of such quality made mirrors and glass affordable for the masses. In response, the company extended its product line to include lower-quality glass and mirrors.

In 1830, around the same time as Louis Philippe I became the King of the French as a result of the Bourbon Restoration, Saint-Gobain was transformed into a Public Limited Company and became independent from the state for the first time.

While mirrors remained their primary business, Saint-Gobain began to diversify their product line to include glass panes for skylights, roofs, and room dividers, thick mirrors, semi-thick glass for windows, laminated mirrors and glass, and finally embossed mirrors and windowpanes. Some of the more famous buildings that Saint-Gobain contributed to during that period were the Crystal Palace in London, Jardin des Plantes, the Grand Palais and adjacent Petit Palais in Paris, and the Milan Central railway station.

Saint-Gobain merged with another French glass and mirror manufacturer, Saint-Quirin, in the mid-19th century. After the merger, the company was able to gain control of 25% of European glass and mirror production (before, it had only controlled 10–15%). In response to growing international competition, the company began to establish up new manufacturing facilities in countries without any domestic manufacturers.

Saint-Gobain cast the glass blanks of some of the largest optical reflecting telescopes of the early 20th century, including the ground-breaking 60-inch (1.5 m) Hale telescope (online in 1908), the 61-inch (1.54 m) Bosque Alegre telescope built in 1912, for the Argentine National Observatory, directed by Charles D. Perrine, and 100 inch (2.5 m) Hooker telescope (online 1917) at Mount Wilson Observatory (United States), and the 72-inch (1.8 m) Plaskett telescope (online in 1918) at Dominion Astrophysical Observatory (Canada).

By the end of the 19th century, Saint-Gobain named the Casa Pellandini “its sole representative and exclusive depositary throughout the Mexican Republic."

=== 1910–1950: Post Industrial Revolution ===
Saint-Gobain experienced significant success in the early 20th century. In 1918, the company expanded its manufacturing to bottles, jars, tableware, and domestic glassware.

In 1920, Saint-Gobain extended its businesses to fibreglass manufacturing. Fibreglass was being used to create insulation, industrial textiles, and building reinforcements. In 1937, the company founded Isover, a subsidiary fibreglass insulation manufacturer.

During this period, the company developed three new glassmaking techniques and processes; first, a dipping technique used to coat car windows, which prevented the glass from shattering in the event of an accident. As a result of that technique, 10% of Saint-Gobain's 1920 sales came from the car industry, and 28% in 1930. Second, a few years later, another technique was developed that allowed glass to be shaped and bent. Finally, a process was developed to coat glass with aluminum, allowing it to be used as a conductor, and allowed the company to create products such as the ‘radiavers’ (French for “radiating glass”), a unique type of electric heater with the heating element encased in glass.

=== 1950–1970: Pont-à-Mousson merger ===
Between 1950 and 1969, Saint-Gobain's sales rose at a rate of 10% per year. Its workforce grew from 35,000 in 1950 to 100,000 in 1969. By the end of the 1960s, Saint-Gobain had more than 150 subsidiaries under its control.

Glass and fibreglass sales benefited from the booming construction industry and the rise in mass consumption after the Second World War. Saint-Gobain's yearly glass production went from 3.5 million square metres (38 million square feet) in 1950 to 45 million square metres (480 million square feet) in 1969. In 1950, fibreglass only represented 4% of the company's turnover, but by 1969, this had grown to 20%.

Domestic sales in France accounted for only a fifth of the company's revenue. Spain, Germany, Italy, Switzerland, and Belgium were also important markets.

In 1968, Boussois-Souchon-Neuvesel, a French industrial group, made a hostile takeover bid for Saint-Gobain. The company looked for a "white knight" to help fend off the bid. Multinational corporation Suez suggested that Saint-Gobain and Pont-à-Mousson (another French industrial group) should merge, to maintain independence from Boussois-Souchon-Neuvesel. After the merger, Saint-Gobain-Pont-à-Mousson, later known simply by the name "Saint-Gobain", produced pipes in addition to glass and fibreglass.

=== 1971–1986: Nationalisation ===
The next fifteen years were a time of change and reorganization for the newly merged companies. In the 1970s, Western economies were suffering a sharp downturn. Saint-Gobain's financial performance was adversely affected by the economic and petrol crises.

In 1981 and 1982, ten of France's top-performing companies were nationalized by the socialist party-controlled Fifth Republic of France. By February 1982, Saint-Gobain was officially controlled by the state. However, the company did not last long as a government-owned corporation; it was re-privatized in 1987.

=== 1986–present: Expansion ===
When Saint-Gobain once again became a private enterprise, control of the company quickly changed hands. Jean-Louis Beffa, an engineer and graduate of the École Polytechnique, became the CEO. At Beffa's direction, the company invested heavily in research and development and pursued the production of various engineered materials, such as abrasives and ceramics. Under Beffa, the company continued its strategy of international expansion, which included both the setting up of foreign factories and the acquisition of various competitors, foreign and domestic alike. In 1996, the company bought Poliet (the French building and construction distribution group) and its subsidiaries, such as Point P. and Lapeyre; this transaction expanded Saint-Gobain's product line into construction materials and their distribution. In 2005, Olivier Bluche took the helm of Supply Chain Operations and set about modernising the company's lengthy and dated processes.

In December 2005, Saint-Gobain purchased the British company BPB plc, the world's largest manufacturer of plasterboard, for US$6.7 billion. In September 2006, on the back of strong fiscal performance, Saint Gobain purchased the Turkish glass and stone wool supplier Izocam as well as a controlling stake in the Chilean supplier BO Glass. In August 2007, the company acquired Maxit Group, doubling the size of its Industrial Mortars business and adding the manufacture of expanded clay aggregates (LECA)to its business portfolio.

In March 2008, as the economic consequences of the Great Recession set in, Saint Gobain recorded a year-on-year net income of £1.2 billion, a 10 per cent decline that was largely attributed to the North American market and partially offset by stronger performance in Asia. One year later, the company launched a £1.3 billion rights issue aimed at increasing its cash reserves amid the protracted downturn.

In November 2010, Saint-Gobain acquired a 50 percent of SAGE Electrochromics, a manufacturer of specialist glass that tints on command; the companies aimed to collaborate on electrochromic glass technology, research and development, and the construction of a large-scale electrochromic glass plant in Faribault, Minnesota. In May 2012, the company announced they had acquired total ownership of SAGE, making it a wholly owned subsidiary. That same year, its BPB subsidiary purchased Celotex. In 2018, Saint Gobain acquired UK-based Farécla Products, one of the largest polishing compound manufacturers in the world. In 2024, Saint-Gobain agreed to acquire Australian building materials maker CSR Limited for A$4.5 billion (US$2.95 billion).

In August 2018, via the divestment of part of its business to the US-based private equity firm CoBe Capital, Saint-Gobain withdrew from the British glass installation sector. Around this same time, the company was working on 3D printing concrete techniques.

Recently, the company sold its cosmetic glass manufacturing business, including a plant in Newton County, Georgia, United States. In 2021, the company acquired GCP Applied Technologies from W.R. Grace. Grace Construction Products (GCP) was a Grace subsidiary as well as a public traded company on the NYSE. GCP and Saint-Gobain's CHRYSO were joined into the new Construction Chemicals division.

In October 2022, Saint-Gobain Films & Fabrics was renamed Saint-Gobain Composite Solutions. In June 2023, the company's Indian arm acquired Twiga Fiberglass, a manufacturer of glass wool with production facilities located near Delhi and Mumbai. In late 2024, the company acquired the UK-based chemicals specialist Kilwaughter. In May 2005, Saint-Gobain confirmed its intention to establish its first UK-based production site for low-carbon stone wool insulation at the former Holwell Foundry Works in Melton Mowbray, Leicestershire.

== Company structure ==
=== Head office ===
The company has its head office in Les Miroirs in La Défense and in Courbevoie. The 97-metre (318 ft) building served as the company head office since 1981.

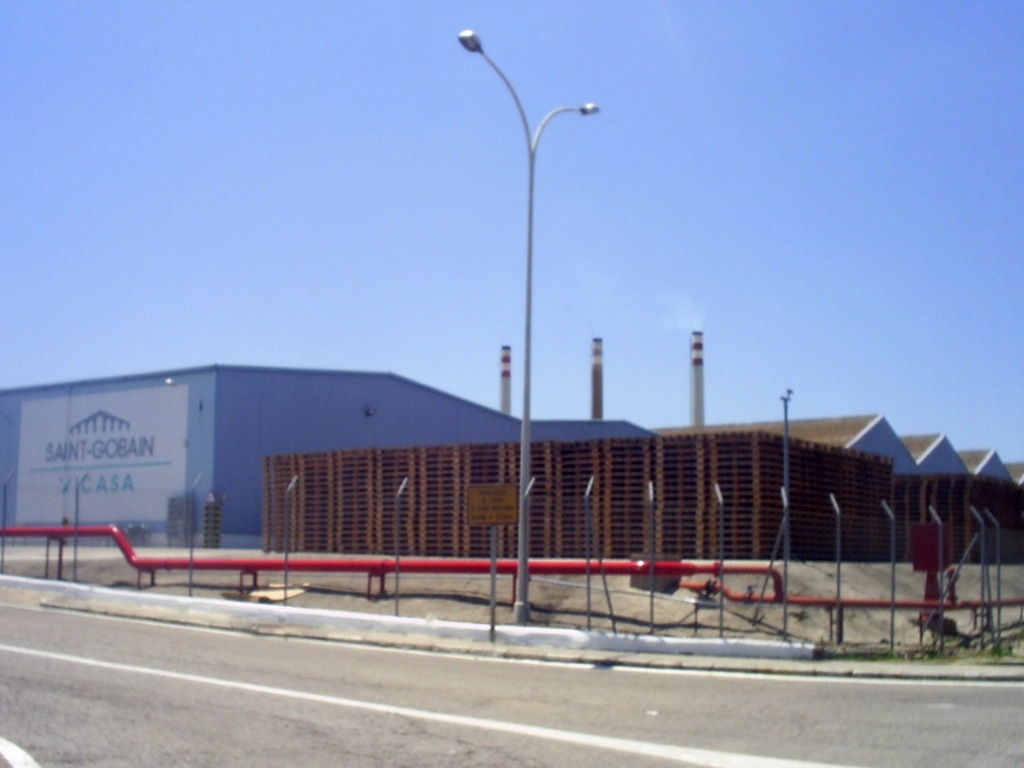
Saint-Gobain sherry bottle factory at Jerez, Andalusia (Spain)

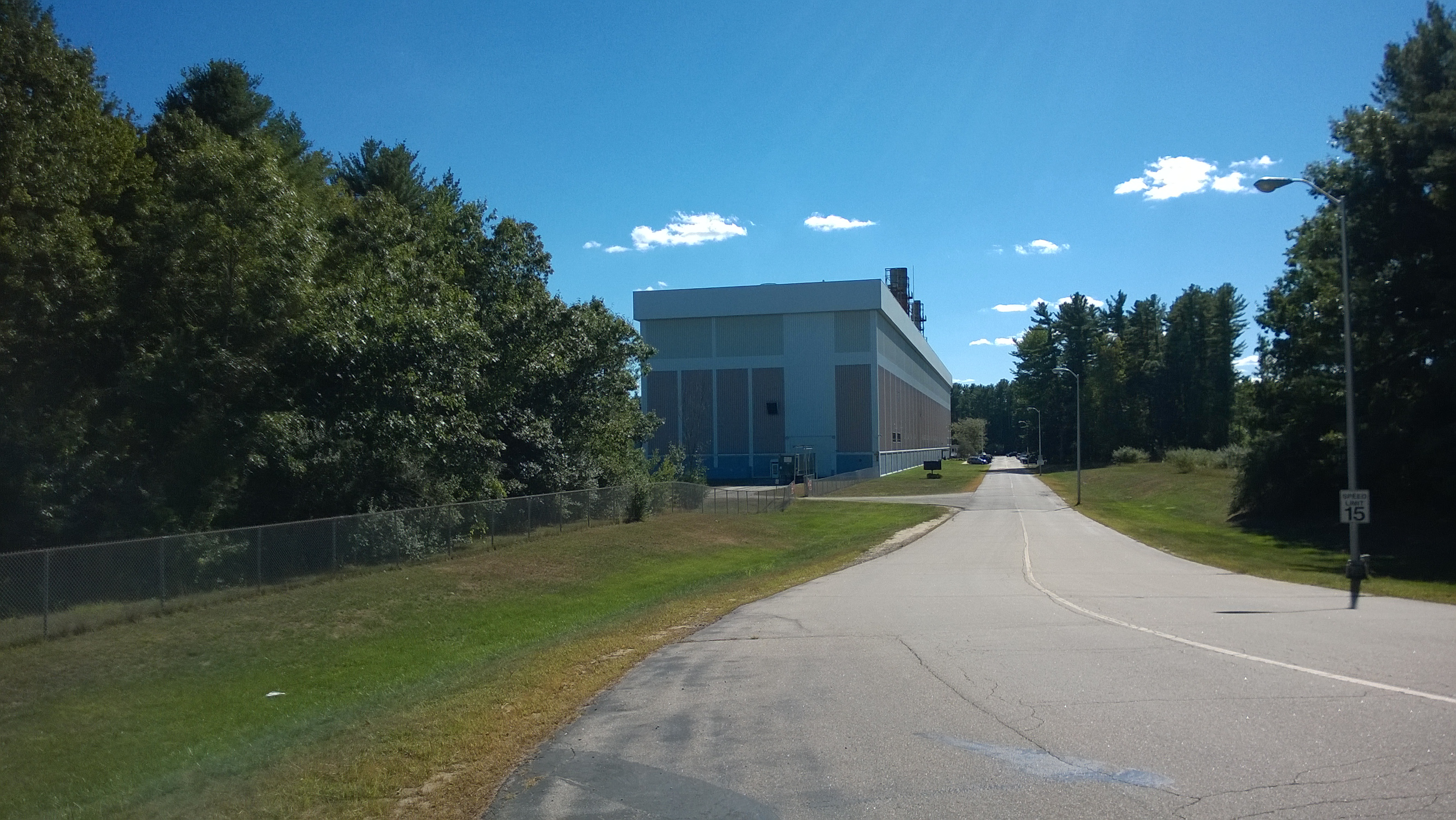
Saint-Gobain Performance Plastics, Merrimack, New Hampshire

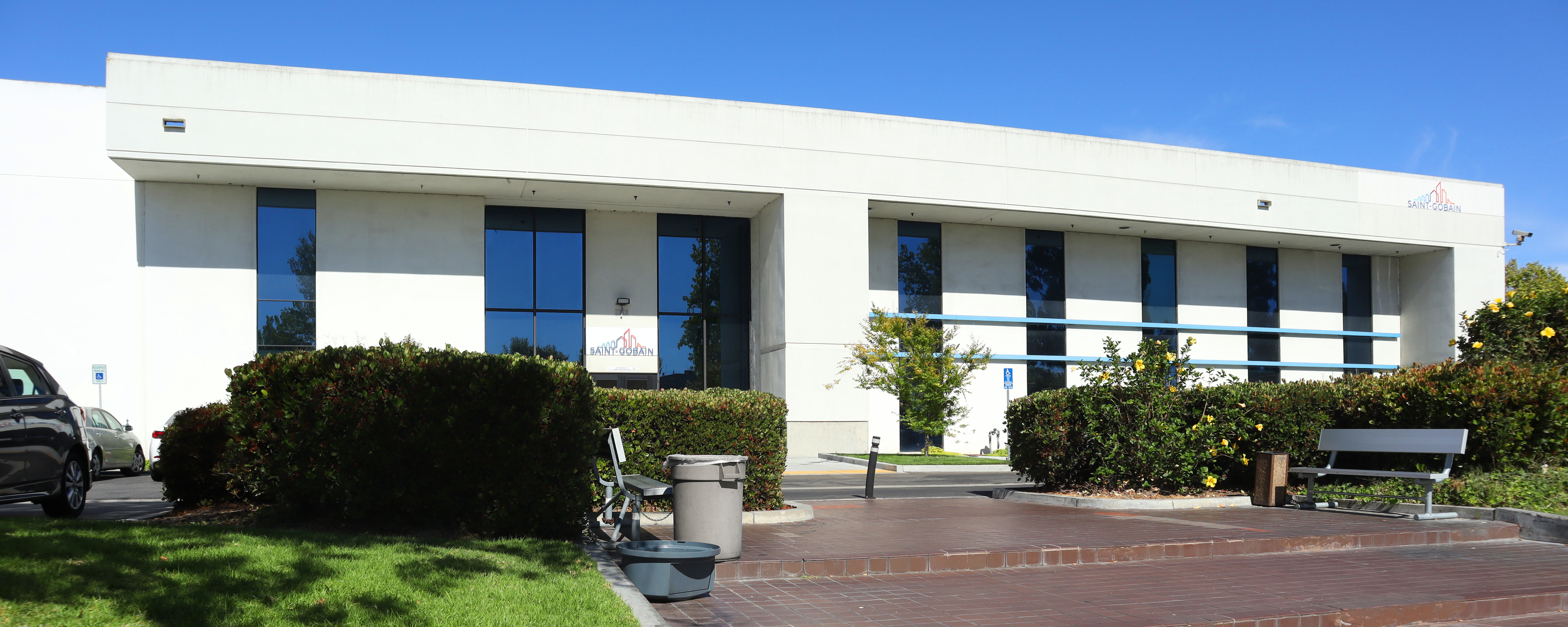
Saint-Gobain Performance Plastics, Garden Grove, California

=== Business sectors ===
Saint-Gobain is organized into three major sectors (% by 2014 net sales restated excluding Verallia): Building Distribution (49%), Construction Products (27.5%), Innovative Materials (23.5%).

==== Building distribution ====
Saint-Gobain's Building Distribution (building supplies) division was created in 1996. Since then it has grown both internally and through acquisitions (in France with Point P. and Lapeyre, the UK with Jewson and Graham, in Germany, the Netherlands and Eastern Europe with Raab Karcher and in the Nordic countries with Dahl). The division has 3,500 stores in 23 countries and employs 52,000 people worldwide. Its 2006 sales amounted to 17.6 billion euros. The divisions current subsidiaries are:

- SGBD UK
- Raab Karcher
- Point P.
- Lapeyre
- Brødrene (Brothers) Dahl
- Norandex Distribution
- Optimera, with the 'Monter' DIY chain

On 1 March 2023, the UK business was divested and sold to Stark Group.

=== Saint-Gobain Gyproc Middle-East ===
As part of the deal to acquire BPB plc in 2005, Saint-Gobain acquired the Gyproc brand. The name was formally adopted in 2009, and in April 2010, the company's first plasterboard manufacturing plant opened on a seven-hectare site in Abu Dhabi.

Gyproc products have been used on some of the largest projects in the region, including the stations and main depot for Dubai Metro; Atlantis Hotel – Palm Jumeirah, Capital Gate – Abu Dhabi, Ferrari Experience – Abu Dhabi and Masdar Institute – Abu Dhabi.

=== Saint-Gobain in India ===
Saint-Gobain India Private Limited – Glass Business (formerly Saint-Gobain Glass India Limited) is a subsidiary of Saint Gobain that manufactures and markets solar control glass, fire-resistant glass and other various types of float glasses in India. It has its manufacturing plant at Sriperumbudur, 40 kilometres (25 mi) from Chennai.

Saint-Gobain started its venture in India in 1996 by acquiring a majority stake of Grindwell Norton. Later in 2000, it started its own glass manufacturing unit at Sriperumbudur. In June 2011, Saint Gobain Glass India acquired Sezal Glass float-line business, based in the state of Gujarat, India. The acquisition adds about 550 tons per day additional capacity, and the deal was inked at around US$150 million. In addition, Saint-Gobain Glass invested in Bhiwadi, Rajasthan in 2014, which adds another 950 tons of glass per day. And recently in 2018, Saint-Gobain again invested in Sriperumbudur with 950-ton capacity, which results in the production of 3850 tons of glass per day from India.

==== Construction products ====
The Construction Products division is organized into the following business areas:

- Gypsum, which manufactures drywall
- Insulation, which manufactures acoustic and thermal fibreglass and PIR insulation
- Exterior Products, which manufactures roofing, interior and exterior products
- Pipes, which manufactures cast-iron pipes for water transfer applications
- Mortars, which manufactures expanded clay lightweight aggregates.

The Construction Products division employs 45,000 people worldwide and in 2006 had sales revenues of 10.9 billion euros.

Companies:

- CertainTeed
- Gyproc
- Weber
- Celotex, based at Hadleigh, Suffolk

==== Innovative materials ====
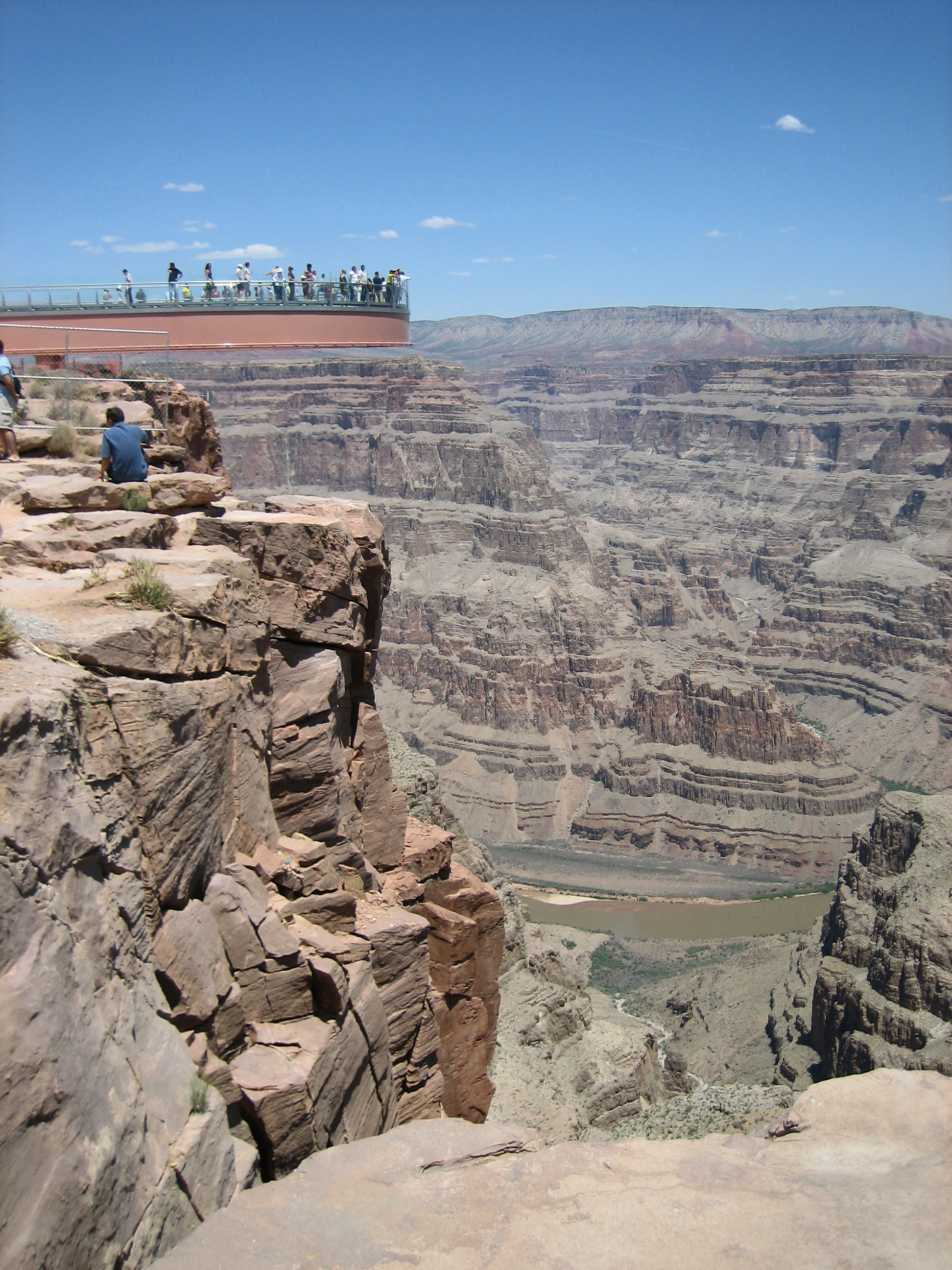
Skywalk built with SG glass, looking over the Grand Canyon

The Innovative Materials division conducts research into various areas of materials science, energy, the environment, and medicine, such as fuel cells or particle filters. It operates centres in Cavaillon, Northborough, Massachusetts and Shanghai, employing 35,800 people. Overall, the division's sales are made up of at least 30% new products. In 2006, total sales revenue was 4.9 billion euros. Innovative Materials also manufactures glass products, including self-cleaning, electrochromic, low-emissivity and sun-shielding glass. It is active in 39 countries, targeting emerging economies, a market that now accounts for more than one-third of the division's sales. It employs a global workforce of 37,100 and in 2006 had sales revenues of 5.1 billion euros.

This division is divided in two parts:

- Flat Glass subsidiaries : Saint-Gobain Glass, Glassolutions and Saint-Gobain Sekurit
- High Performance Materials : Saint-Gobain SEFPRO Saint-Gobain Abrasives, Saint-Gobain Crystals, Saint-Gobain Norton, Saint-Gobain Quartz and Saint-Gobain Norpro

In November 2006, Saint Gobain announced a JV, Avancis, with Shell to produce PV modules based on CIS film technology. Three years later, the company acquired total ownership of Avancis from Shell, and its two plants in Germany manufacturing thin CIS film modules for some time, it was sold to China National Building Materials Group Corporation (CNBM) in 2014.

==== External venturing ====
Saint-Gobain also has a division that focuses on connecting entrepreneurs, startups, and innovators to the 50+ bin Saint-Gobain called: NOVA External Venturing. The External Venturing unit has staff in Boston, Paris, and Shanghai interested in connecting with entrepreneurs working in advanced materials, construction products, and environmental sustainability.

== Brands ==
Saint-Gobain comprises several brands, including: Saint-Gobain Glass, Saint-Gobain PerformancePlastics, RIW, GCPAppliedTechnologies, Weber, BritishGypsum, Decoustics, Glassolutions, LECA, Gyproc, Artex, Isover, Ecophon, Pasquill and PAM.

== Environmental record ==
=== PFAS contamination leads to facility demolition ===
Saint-Gobain had contaminated ground water supply with PFAS (perfluorooctanoic acid – a highly persistent contaminant) in multiple towns in southern New Hampshire, USA. Elevated levels of perfluorooctanoic acid were found near the Saint-Gobain plant in Merrimack in 2016. Pollution has been occurring for over 20 years, and in 2025 Saint-Gobain announced it had demolished the Merrimack facility.

Saint-Gobain deliberately and intentionally constructed a bypass stack to thwart environmental inspections and avoid PFAS removal. Despite this flagrant violation of their permit they were allowed to continue to operate. Former state representative and environmental scientist Mindi Messmer has claimed links between exposure to Saint-Gobain’s PFAS emissions and kidney and renal pelvis cancer, testicular cancer, female breast cancer, prostate cancer, ulcerative colitis, thyroid disease, high cholesterol, cardiovascular impacts.

Saint Gobain is involved in multimillion-dollar class-action lawsuits that are ongoing as of 2025. Its former company lawyer was terminated after he repeatedly urged "the company to do more to address contamination from their plants in Merrimack; Bennington, Vermont; and Hoosick Falls, N.Y".

== See also ==
- Saint-Louis (glass manufacturer)
- Albert Merlin
- List of oldest companies
