= Laboratoire Aimé-Cotton =

Research institute of the Paris-Saclay University

- Established: 1927
- Mission: Fundamental research
- Focus: Atomic physics
- President: Olivier Dulieu
- Location: Orsay, Île-de-France, France
- Coordinates: 48.7071545°N 2.1725917°E
- Website: http://www.lac.universite-paris-saclay.fr/
- Location of the lab in Île-de-France

The Aimé-Cotton Laboratory (French: Laboratoire Aimé-Cotton) or LAC, located in Orsay, is a joint research unit (UMR 9025) of the French National Centre for Scientific Research (CNRS) and the Paris-Saclay University.

== History ==
The Aimé-Cotton laboratory was created in 1927 as an annex to the Physical Research Laboratory of the Faculty of Sciences of the University of Paris, on the occasion of the construction of the Large Electromagnet of the Academy of Sciences at Meudon-Bellevue, of which Aimé Cotton, at the origin of the project in 1914, solemnly announced the completion on July 9, 1928. First director of the laboratory of the Grand electromagnet de Bellevue, Aimé Cotton's successors in 1941 were Gaston Dupouy then, in 1950, Pierre Jacquinot.

Successively "electromagnet and low temperatures laboratory", "low temperatures laboratory", "low temperatures and intense magnetic fields laboratory" then "magnetism and magneto-optics laboratory", the laboratory took over in 1951, on the initiative of Pierre Jacquinot and not without his having encountered the objection that a CNRS laboratory had never been named after someone, the name of the Aimé-Cotton laboratory (LAC).

Competed, in Bellevue itself, by the magnetism laboratory of Charles Guillaud, the LAC (whose contribution to magnetism was fiercely judged by Louis Néel by declaring “Industrially, they never managed to make a single thing. It was lead soles this laboratory...") then turned more particularly towards atomic spectroscopy and played a pioneering role in the development of Fourier transform spectrometry, to the development of which, from 1954, Pierre and Janine Connes devoted themselves. From the conference on “interferometric spectrometry” organized in Bellevue in 1957 by P. Jacquinot, the LAC played the role of a nursery for the dissemination of this new spectrometric technique.

Under the direction of Robert Chabbal, the LAC moved in 1967 to the Orsay campus of the Paris-Sud University, on the edge of the Moulon plateau. On January 1, 2015, the LAC, which until then was its own research unit (UPR no. 3321) of the CNRS associated with the Paris-Sud University, became a Joint Research Unit (UMR), under the triple supervision of the CNRS, the Paris-Sud University and the Ecole Normale Supérieure of Cachan. This unit was dissolved on December 31, 2019, to make way for two “formations de recherche en évolution” (FRE): one taking the name Aimé-Cotton laboratory and the other LuMIn (Light, Matter and Interfaces). The Aimé-Cotton laboratory will once again become a Joint Research Unit (UMR no. 9025) from January 1, 2022.
