= Charles Jacob =

Charles Jacob may refer to:

- Charles Donald Jacob (1838–1898), American politician who served as mayor of Louisville, Kentucky and United States Minister to Colombia
- Charles Jacob (stockbroker) (1921–2015), British stockbroker
- Charles Jacob (geologist) (1878–1962), French geologist and president of the French National Centre for Scientific Research from 1940 to 1944

== See also ==
- Charles Jacobs (disambiguation)
