= Janine Connes =

French astronomer (1926–2024)

- Born: Janine Roux; 19 May 1926
- Died: 28 November 2024 (aged 98); Orsay, France
- Known for: Fourier transform infrared spectroscopy Connes's advantage
- Spouse: Pierre Connes (m. 1951–2019)
- Scientific career
- Fields: Astronomy
- Workplaces: Laboratoire Aimé-Cotton; Centre inter-régional de calcul électronique (CIRCÉ)
- Academic advisors: Pierre Jacquinot

Janine Connes (née Roux, 19 May 1926 – 28 November 2024) was a French astronomer whose research led to the establishment of the Fourier transform infrared spectroscopy method, which was of major significance and laid the foundations of what was to grow into a significant new field.

Connes was married to Pierre Connes, a fellow astronomer, until his death in 2019. The couple often conducted research together. Together with her husband and Robert B. Leighton, they were nominated for the Nobel Prize in Physics in 1970.

== Research ==
The Connes work was primarily in analysing the Fourier transform infrared spectroscopy technique, a field the couple began studying in 1954 in Laboratoire Aimé-Cotton directed by Pierre Jacquinot. Her 1961 thesis and subsequent publications gave in-depth analysis of the practical details necessary for its use, with her thesis credited for establishing many of the early design principles.

She collaborated and travelled often to the Jet Propulsion Laboratory of NASA. With her husband Pierre Connes she imaged Venus and Mars at the Observatoire du Pic du Midi de Bigorre using the method, presenting images far better than others taken at the time. Connes identified the registration advantage of using interferometry. This result is known as Connes's advantage.

She was the founder of the Centre inter-régional de calcul électronique (CIRCÉ) in Orsay in 1969, attached to the French National Centre for Scientific Research (CNRS). She works there as director of the center until 1982. She left this position to work as the director of scientific informatics of the CNRS.

Connes died on 28 November 2024, at the age of 98.

== Awards ==
She was awarded the Prix Aimé Cotton by the Société Française de Physique in 1961.

== Publications ==
- "The Field of Application of the Fourier Transform Method," J. Phys. Radium 19: 197 (1958)
- "A Study of the Night Sky in the Near Infrared," J. Phys. Radium 21: 645 (1960), with H.P. Gush [in French]
- "Near-Infrared Planetary Spectra by Fourier Spectroscopy. I. Instruments and Results," Journal of the Optical Society of America 56: 896 (1966), with P. Connes [in English]

The following four papers are" fundamental works of extreme importance to the field" -- Professor Ian McLean.

- "Spectroscopic Studies Using Fourier Transformations," Rev. Opt. 40 (no.2): 45 (1961) [in French]
- "Spectroscopic Studies Using Fourier Transformations," Rev. Opt. 40 (no.3): 116 (1961) [in French]
- "Spectroscopic Studies Using Fourier Transformations," Rev. Opt. 40 (no.4): 171 (1961) [in French]
- "Spectroscopic Studies Using Fourier Transformations," Rev. Opt. 40 (no.5): 231 (1961) [in French]
- "Fourier Transform Spectroscopy: Introductory Report," Mem. Soc. Roy. Sci. Liège 9: 81 (1964) [in French]
