= Anne Boutin =

French chemist (born 1968)

- Born: 24 November 1968 (age 57)
- Education: Paris-Sud University; University of Paris-XI; Imperial College
- Occupations: Physical chemist and theoretical chemist

Anne Boutin (born 24 November 1968) is a French physical chemist and theoretical chemist, research director at the CNRS and director of the Department of Chemistry at the École Normale Supérieure. A specialist in molecular thermodynamics, she develops molecular simulation tools as well as theoretical approaches for studying the structure, dynamics, thermodynamics and reactivity of confined molecular fluids.

== Biography ==
Boutin did her graduate studies at the École Normale Supérieure (ENS) and at the University of Paris-XI in Orsay, France. She obtained her doctorate in physical chemistry at Sorbonne Paris South, the University of Paris-XI in 1992, for her thesis under the supervision of chemist Alain Fuchs entitled, The fusion of a molecular crystal. A numerical simulation study of molecular dynamics. She completed her post-doctorate at Imperial College, London and completed her habilitation in 1999.

She was recruited as a research fellow at the French National Centre for Scientific Research (CNRS) in 1994, within the Physical Chemistry Laboratory (CNRS, University of Paris-XI). She was promoted to research director in 2005.

The specific chemistry fields that interest her include: metal-organic framework, adsorption, topology, chemical physics and molecular dynamics.

Since 2009, she has been working in the PASTEUR laboratory (Selective activation process by uni-electronic or radiative energy transfer) of the ENS. She is a professor attached to the ENS, and was director of the Department of Chemistry at the ENS from 2014 to 2021.

She is a member of the board of directors of AFDESRI (Association for women leaders in higher education, research and innovation), which has the objective of fighting against the glass ceiling that affects women in academic fields.

== Honors and distinctions ==
- Knight of the Legion of Honor, 2017
- CNRS Bronze Medal, 1999
- Nathalie Demassieux thesis prize from the Chancellery of the Universities of Paris, 1993

== Selected works ==
- Ungerer, Philippe, Christele Beauvais, Jérôme Delhommelle, Anne Boutin, Bernard Rousseau, and Alain H. Fuchs. "Optimization of the anisotropic united atoms intermolecular potential for n-alkanes." The Journal of Chemical Physics 112, no. 12 (2000): 5499-5510.
- Boutin, Anne, Marie-Anne Springuel-Huet, Andrei Nossov, Antoine Gedeon, Thierry Loiseau, Christophe Volkringer, Gérard Férey, François-Xavier Coudert, and Alain H. Fuchs. "Breathing transitions in MIL-53 (Al) metal–organic framework upon xenon adsorption." Angewandte Chemie 121, no. 44 (2009): 8464-8467.
- Boutin, Anne, François-Xavier Coudert, Marie-Anne Springuel-Huet, Alexander V. Neimark, Gérard Férey, and Alain H. Fuchs. "The behavior of flexible MIL-53 (Al) upon CH4 and CO2 adsorption." The Journal of Physical Chemistry C 114, no. 50 (2010): 22237-22244.
- Ortiz, Aurélie U., Anne Boutin, Alain H. Fuchs, and François-Xavier Coudert. "Anisotropic elastic properties of flexible metal-organic frameworks: how soft are soft porous crystals?." Physical review letters 109, no. 19 (2012): 195502.
