= Fellgett's advantage =

Fellgett's advantage or the multiplex advantage is an improvement in signal-to-noise ratio (SNR) that is gained when taking multiplexed measurements rather than direct measurements. The name is derived from P. B. Fellgett, who first made the observation as part of his PhD. When measuring a signal whose noise is dominated by detector noise, a multiplexed measurement such as the signal generated by a Fourier transform spectrometer can produce a relative improvement in SNR, compared to an equivalent scanning monochromator, of the order of the square root of m, where m is the number of sample points comprising the spectrum.

== Exit slit ==
Sellar and Boreman have argued that this SNR improvement can be considered as a result of freedom from needing an exit slit inside the spectrometer, since an exit slit reduces the light collected by the detector by the same factor.

== Emission ==
There is an additional multiplex advantage for emission lines of atomic and molecular spectra. At the peak of the emission line, a monochromator measurement will be noisy, since the noise is proportional to the square root of the signal. For the same reason, the measurement will be less noisy at the baseline of the spectrum. In a multiplexed measurement, however, the noise in a given measurement is spread more or less evenly across the spectrum, regardless of the local signal intensity. Thus, multiplexed measurements can achieve higher SNR at the emission line peaks. There is a corresponding multiplex disadvantage, however. When the signals of interest are absorption lines in the spectrum, then the same principle will produce increased noise at the valleys of the absorption lines relative to the noise of a scanning monochromator.

== Shot noise ==
However, if the detector is shot noise dominated (which is typically the case for a photomultiplier tube), noise will be proportional to the square root of the power, so that for a broad flat spectrum the noise will be proportional to the square root of m, where m is the number of sample points comprising the spectrum, thus this disadvantage precisely offsets the Fellgett advantage. Shot noise is the main reason Fourier transform spectroscopy has never been popular for UV and visible light spectrometry.

== See also ==
- Fourier transform infrared spectroscopy
- Raman spectroscopy
