= Catherine Bréchignac =

French physicist

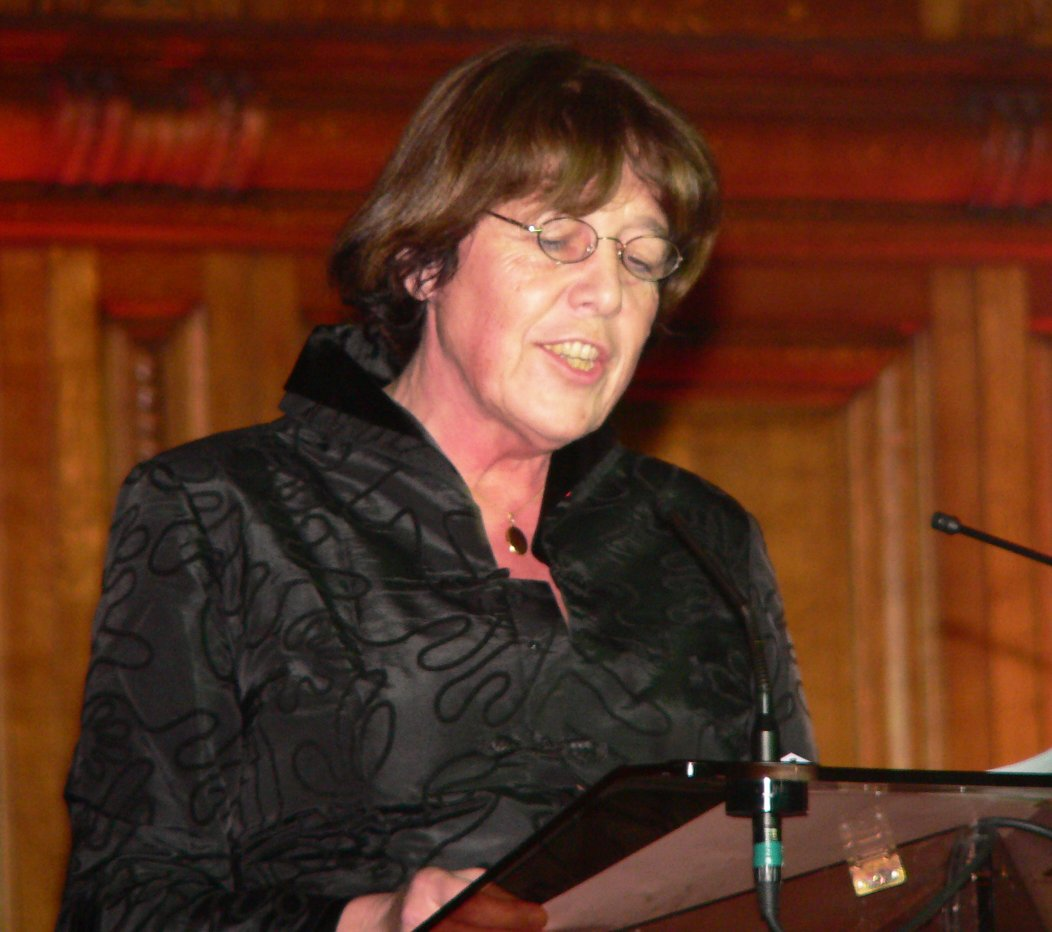
- Catherine Bréchignac in 2006
- Born: 12 June 1946 (age 80); Paris, France
- Education: École Normale Supérieure de Lyon; Faculté des sciences d'Orsay
- Awards: Grand Officier of the Légion d'honneur Many others, see article
- Scientific career
- Fields: Physics
- Workplaces: CNRS

Catherine Bréchignac (French pronunciation: [katʁin bʁeʃiɲak]; born 12 June 1946) is a French physicist. She is a commander of the Légion d'honneur, "secrétaire perpétuel honoraire" of the Académie des sciences and former president of the CNRS ("National Centre for Scientific Research"). The Times says she has "a formidable reputation for determination, decisiveness and an aptitude for analysing and clarifying complex matters." As a president of the CNRS, she was responsible for 25,000 employees, 12,000 of whom are researchers, and a budget of 2.42 billion Euros.

== Biography ==
Daughter of the physicist Jean Teillac, Catherine Bréchignac entered the École Normale Supérieure de Fontenay-aux-Roses in 1967, she received her DEA (Masters-level qualification) at the Faculté des sciences d'Orsay in 1971, her doctorate in 1977, and became a Research Director in 1985. In 1989, she became director of the Aimé Cotton laboratory and was Director General of the CNRS from 1997 to 2000. She clashed with Claude Allègre, the minister at the time, over reforms she oversaw at the institution. She became President of the Institut d'optique théorique et appliquée ("Institute of Optical Theory and Practice") in 2003 and of the Palais de la découverte ("Palace of Discovery") in 2004. In 2005, she was elected future president of the International Council for Science (ICSU). She was appointed President of the CNRS at the Council of Ministers of 11 January 2006 on the recommendation of François Goulard, the minister for higher education and research. She was replaced by Alain Fuchs in 2010, even though she was a candidate to her own succession. She was "secrétaire perpétuel" (permanent secretary) of the Académie des sciences, Division 1, from 2011 to 2018.

== Field ==
According to the International Council for Science, Bréchignac co-founded the field of cluster physics, which straddles the gap between atomic, molecular and solid-state physics. Clusters are "the precursors of nano-objects."

== Other functions and honours ==
- President of the CNRS
- Member of the Institute
- President of the Board of the Palais de la Découverte
- President of the International Council for Science
- Member of the Academy of Technologies
- Director of Renault
- "Commandeur" of the Legion d'honneur
- Prix de l 'Académie des Sciences (1991)
- CNRS Silver Medal (1994)
- Correspondent member of the Academy of Sciences (1997)
- Winner of the Holweck Medal (2003)
- Member of the Academy of Sciences (2005)
- Doctor Honoris Causa of the Freie Universität Berlin (2003), the Georgia Tech Institute (2006) and the École Polytechnique Fédérale de Lausanne (2007)
- Member of Academia Europaea (2009)
