= Unité mixte de recherche =

French mixed research unit

In France, a unité mixte de recherche (UMR), or joint research unit as translated into English, is an administrative type of research laboratory that is partially supported by CNRS and partially by other organizations or universities, in terms of funds, academic and non-academic staff, and other type of support.

== History ==
The original concept of the French UMR dates back to 1966, when the CNRS created the laboratoires associés (associated laboratories), overseen by then-director of CNRS Pierre Jacquinot.

In 2021, various changes were implemented to simplify the organization of UMRs.

=== Other structures ===
Prior to the 2021 simplifications, other structures included

- Unité propre de recherche (UPR)
- Unité mixte internationale (UMI)
- ...

== See also ==
- List of unités mixtes de recherche
