= Robert Chabbal =

French physician and scientific researcher (1927–2020)

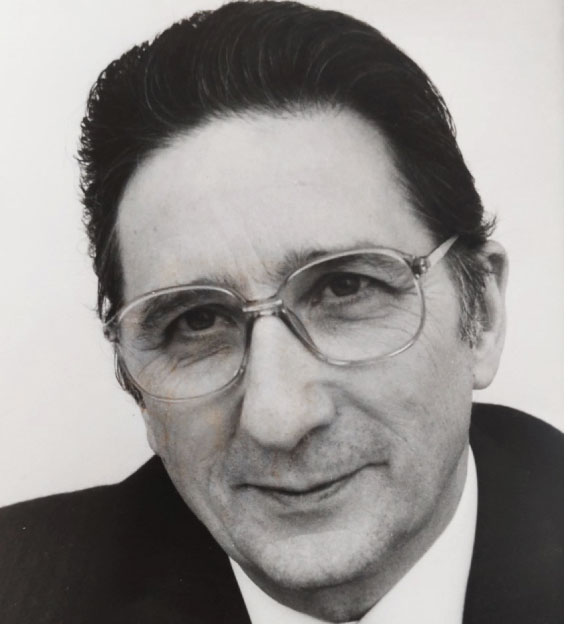
- Born: 6 February 1927
- Died: 14 September 2020 (aged 93)
- Awards: Commander of the Legion of Honour
- Scientific career
- Institutions: OECD; French Ministry of Research and Technology; NATO; French National Centre for Scientific Research; Laboratoire Aimé-Cotton; Paris-Saclay Faculty of Sciences; Faculté des sciences de Paris

Robert Chabbal (6 February 1927 – 14 September 2020) was a French physician and scientific researcher. He was Director General of the French National Centre for Scientific Research (CNRS) from 1976 to 1979.

== Biography ==
After his studies at the École normale supérieure in Paris, Chabbal began his career as a physician. He became a professor at the Faculté des sciences de Paris in 1959 and at the Paris-Saclay Faculty of Sciences in Orsay in 1965. He was also Director of the Laboratoire Aimé-Cotton from 1962 to 1969.

In 1969, Chabbal became director of physical sciences at the CNRS. There, he founded the Programme interdisciplinaire de recherche pour l'énergie solaire (PIRDES), of which he became the director. He was Director General of the CNRS from 1976 to 1979, and gave great importance to the engineering sciences while in office.

From 1980 to 1983, Chabbal worked at NATO as Deputy Secretary General for Scientific Affairs. From 1983 to 1987, he led the Scientific and Technical Committee at the French Ministry of Research and Technology. From 1988 to 1992, he worked at the OECD in the department of science and technologies. He also chaired the Scientific Programs Committee of the CNES. From 2005 to 2007, he worked in the ministerial cabinet of François Goulard and helped create Label Carnot. He worked on several boards of directors, including Saint-Gobain, ANVAR, and the French Institute for Research in Computer Science and Automation.

Robert Chabbal died on 14 September 2020 at the age of 93.

== Reports ==
- Un plan d'action pour les PME innovantes (1997)
- Rapport sur la formation entrepreneuriale des ingénieurs (1998)
- Rapport sur l'Enseignement supérieur en France (2007)
- Le devenir de l'Ingénierie (2008)

== Distinctions ==
- Honorary Member of the Royal Swedish Academy of Engineering Sciences (1976)
- Commander of the Legion of Honour
