= Peter Fellgett =

British physicist

Peter Berners Fellgett
- Born: 11 April 1922
- Died: 15 November 2008 (aged 86)
- Citizenship: British
- Education: University of Cambridge
- Known for: Fellgett Advantage
- Awards: R. W. Wood Prize
- Scientific career
- Workplaces: University of Reading

Peter Berners Fellgett FRS, FIEE (11 April 1922 – 15 November 2008) was a British physicist. He was the professor of Cybernetics at the University of Reading .

== Fellgett's advantage ==
He is best known for Fellgett's advantage: the improvement of the signal-to-noise ratio by using multiplex measurements, i.e. simultaneous measurement at different wavelengths, such as Fourier transform spectroscopy.

This work emerged from his 1949 dissertation (Theory of Infra-Red Sensitivities and Its Application to Investigations of Stellar Radiation in the Near Infra-Red) while at the University of Cambridge.

== Royal Observatory Edinburgh ==
From Cambridge he moved to the Royal Observatory Edinburgh where he continued his interests in instrument science.

== University of Reading ==
In 1964, he moved to the University of Reading where he became professor of Cybernetics and Instrument Physics. While at Reading he was involved on research in Ambisonics (with Michael Gerzon), as well as continuing his interest in instrumentation. He retired in 1987. His Professorship (in Cybernetics) was taken over by Kevin Warwick.

== Awards ==
He received the R. W. Wood Prize in 1977, became a fellow of the Royal Society of Edinburgh in 1961 and a fellow of the Royal Society in 1986. He was an Honorary Fellow of the Cybernetics Society.
