= Alain Fuchs =

Swiss-born French chemist (1953–2024)

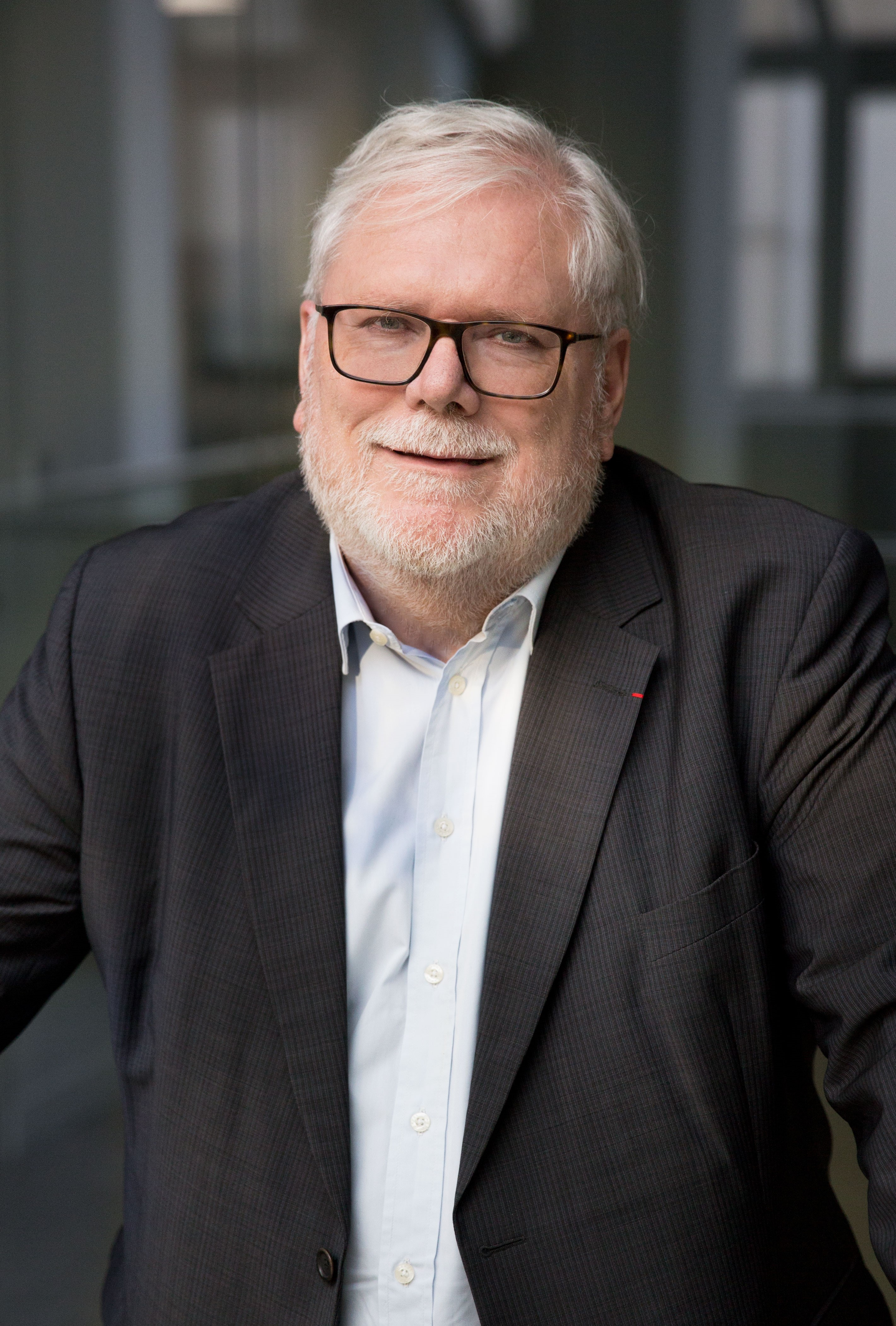
- Fuchs in 2018
- Born: 10 April 1953; Lausanne, Vaud, Switzerland
- Died: 8 December 2024 (aged 71); Paris, France
- Citizenship: French
- Education: École Polytechnique Fédérale de Lausanne
- Scientific career
- Fields: Physical Chemistry
- Institutions: PSL Research University; Centre national de la recherche scientifique; University of Paris-Sud; Chimie ParisTech; Université Pierre-et-Marie-Curie
- Doctoral advisor: Henri Szwarc

Alain Fuchs (10 April 1953 – 8 December 2024) was a Swiss-born French chemist. A Doctor of Science and Professor of Chemistry, he specialised in molecular simulation. Fuchs served as the president of Chimie ParisTech - PSL from 2006 to 2010. He also served as the president of the French National Centre for Scientific Research from 2010 to 2017.' Fuchs became an Officer of the Legion of Honour in 2014.

From 24 October 2017 until 26 June 2024, Fuchs was president of PSL University (Paris Sciences & Lettres).

== Biography ==
Alain Fuchs graduated as a Chemical engineer (1975) at EPFL. In 1983, he became a doctor in Physical Chemistry at Université Paris-Sud (now Paris-Saclay University; his dissertation was "Cristaux vitreux et transition vitreuse" (about glass crystals). He was also a postdoctoral fellow at the University of Edinburgh (1984–1985).

=== Career ===
Fuchs joined CNRS in 1985 as a research fellow. He became a research director in 1991. In 1995, he became chemistry professor at Université Paris-Sud. Between 2000 and 2005, he set up and directed the Laboratory of Physical Chemistry (UMR 8000) at Campus d'Orsay. He also worked as the President of the agrégation in chemistry from 1998 to 2001 and he directed the Section 13 of the Comité national de la recherche scientifique between 2004 and 2008. He was also Professor at the Université Pierre et Marie Curie (UPMC) in thermodynamics and statistical thermodynamics, intermolecular and surface forces, molecular simulation techniques, history of chemistry and physical chemistry. He served as the president of Chimie ParisTech from 2006 to 2010.

In January 2010, he was appointed President of the CNRS, succeeding Catherine Bréchignac (former President) d'Arnold Migus (former managing director). Fuchs's mandate ended in 2014. After holding the position in interim for one month, he was appointed again by the Ministry of Higher Education.

In October 2017, Fuchs quit the position of CNRS President and became the President of Université PSL (collegiate university including 9 members and 10 associate members). He left the position for personal reasons in June 2024.

=== Death ===
Fuchs died in Paris on 8 December 2024, at the age of 71.

== Fields of research ==
His research activity was dedicated to the theory, modelling and molecular thermodynamics of fluids confined in various types of porous materials modeling and molecular simulation of confined fluids. "Forced intrusion of water and aqueous solutions in microporous materials: from fundamental thermodynamics to energy storage devices" (Chem. Soc. Rev.,46 (2017)) or "On the use of the IAST method for gas separation studies in porous materials with gate-opening behavior" (Adsorption, 24 (2018)) are part of his last recent and major publications.

Alain Fuchs was a member of the Academia Europaea and he was a member of the editorial board of the journal Physical Chemistry Chemical Physics.

Fuchs co-authored two books:

- Anne Boutin; Gilberte Dosseh; Alain Fuchs (1997). Éléments de thermodynamique. Cours et exercices corrigés pour le deuxième cycle de chimie, chimie-physique et sciences physiques (in French). Elsevier Masson.
- Georges Bram; Françoise Chamozzi; Alain Fuchs; André Grelon; Caroline Lanciano-Morandat; Laurence Mordenti (1995). La Chimie dans la société. Son rôle, son image (in French). L'Harmattan.

=== Major works ===
- Anne Boutin; François-Xavier Coudert; Guillaume Fraux; Alain Fuchs (2017). "Forced intrusion of water and aqueous solutions in microporous materials: from fundamental thermodynamics to energy storage devices". Chem. Soc. Rev. 46 (23): 7421–7437. doi:10.1039/C7CS00478H. PMID 29051934.
- Thomas D. Bennett; Anthony K. Cheetham; François-Xavier Coudert; Alain Fuchs (2017). "Interplay between defects, disorder and flexibility in metal-organic frameworks". Nature Chemistry. 9 (1): 11–16. arXiv:1904.09497. Bibcode:2017NatCh...9...11B. doi:10.1038/nchem.2691. PMID 27995920. S2CID 205297136.
- François-Xavier Coudert; Alain Fuchs (2016). "Computational characterization and prediction of metal-organic framework properties". Coordination Chemistry Reviews. 307: 2011–236. arXiv:1506.08219. doi:10.1016/j.ccr.2015.08.001. S2CID 94219114.
- Thomas D. Bennett; Anthony K. Cheetham; François-Xavier Coudert; Alain Fuchs (2016). "Flexibility and disorder in metal-organic frameworks" (PDF). Dalton Transactions. 45 (10): 4058–4059. doi:10.1039/c6dt90026g. PMID 26902898.
- Anne Boutin; François-Xavier Coudert; Alain Fuchs; Aurélie U. Ortiz (2012). "Anisotropic elastic properties of flexible metal-organic frameworks: how soft are soft porous crystals?". Physical Review Letters. 109 (19) 195502. arXiv:1209.6378. Bibcode:2012PhRvL.109s5502O. doi:10.1103/PhysRevLett.109.195502. PMID 23215398. S2CID 5759301.
- Anne Boutin; François-Xavier Coudert; Alain Fuchs; Alexander V. Neimark (2010). "Stress-based model for the " breathing " of metal-organic frameworks". Journal of Physical Chemistry Letters (1): 445.
- Anne Boutin; François-Xavier Coudert; Gerard Ferey; Alain Fuchs; Antoine Gedeon; Thierry Loiseau; Andrei Nossov; Marie-Anne Springuel-Huet; Christophe Volkringer (2009). "Breathing transitions in MIL-53(Al) Metal-Organic Framework upon xenon adsorption" (PDF). Angewandte Chemie International Edition. 48 (44): 8314–8317. doi:10.1002/anie.200903153. PMID 19780084.
- Anne Boutin; François-Xavier Coudert; Alain Fuchs; Marie Jeffroy; Caroline Mellot-Draznieks (2008). "Thermodynamics of guest-induced structural transitions in hybrid organic-inorganic frameworks". Journal of the American Chemical Society. 130 (43): 14294–14502. arXiv:1904.09588. Bibcode:2008JAChS.13014294C. doi:10.1021/ja805129c. PMID 18821758. S2CID 19717405.
- Anne Boutin; Fabien Cailliez; Isabelle Demachy; Alain Fuchs; Joël Patarin; Michel Soulard; Mickael Trzpit (2008). "Thermodynamics of water intrusion in nanoporous hydrophobic solids". Physical Chemistry Chemical Physics. 10 (32): 4817–4826. Bibcode:2008PCCP...10.4817C. doi:10.1039/b807471b. PMID 18688525. S2CID 205714019.
- Anne Boutin; Fabien Cailliez; Isabelle Demachy; Nicolas Desbiens; Alain Fuchs; Joël Patarin; Michel Soulard; Mickael Trzpit (2007). "The effect of local defects on water adsorption in silicalite-1 zeolite. A joint experimental and molecular simulation study". Langmuir (23): 10131.
- Isabelle Demachy; Nicolas Desbiens; Alain Fuchs; Helène Kirsch-Rodeschini; Joël Patarin; Michel Soulard (2005). "Water condensation in hydrophobic nanopores". Angewandte Chemie International Edition. 44 (33): 5310–3. Bibcode:2005ACIE...44.5310D. doi:10.1002/anie.200501250. PMID 16035017.
- Anthony K. Cheetham; Alain Fuchs (2001). "Adsorption of guest molecules in zeolitic materials: computational aspects". The Journal of Physical Chemistry B. 105 (31): 7375. Bibcode:2001JPCB..105.7375F. doi:10.1021/jp010702q.
- Christele Beauvais; Anne Boutin; Jerome Delhommelle; Alain Fuchs; Bernard Rousseau; Philippe Ungerer (2000). "Optimization of the anisotropic united atoms intermolecular potential for n-alkanes". Journal of Chemical Physics. 112 (12): 5499. Bibcode:2000JChPh.112.5499U. doi:10.1063/1.481116.
- Anne Boutin; Alain Fuchs; Jean-Bernard Maillet (1996). "Numerical evidence of an embryonic orientational phase transition in small nitrogen clusters". Physical Review Letters. 76 (23): 4336–4339. Bibcode:1996PhRvL..76.4336M. doi:10.1103/physrevlett.76.4336. PMID 10061264.

== Honours and awards ==
- Knight of Palmes académiques (1996)
- Fellow of the Royal Society of Chemistry (2006)
- Knight of the Legion of Honour (2010)
- Officer of the National Order of Merit (2014)
- Officer of the National Order of Quebec (2014)
