= Charles Jacobs =

Charles Jacobs may refer to:

- Charles Fenno Jacobs (1904–1975), photojournalist, World War II and postwar period
- Charles M. Jacobs (1850–1919), English civil engineer
- Charles Jacobs (activist) (fl. 1980s–2010s), co-founder, president, and board member of the American Anti-Slavery Group
- Ron Jacobs (rugby union) (Charles Ronald Jacobs, 1928–2002), captain of the England national rugby union team
- Clare Jacobs (1886–1971), pole vault, 1908 Olympic Games, often mistakenly listed in sources as Charles Jacobs

== See also ==
- Charles Jacob (disambiguation)
