= Charles Jacob (geologist) =

French geologist

- Born: 1878
- Died: 1962 (aged 83–84)
- Occupation: Geologist

Charles Jacob (1878-1962) was a French geologist. He served as the president of the French National Centre for Scientific Research from 1940 to 1944 under Vichy France.

== Early life ==
Charles Jacob was born in 1878.

== Career ==
Jacob was a geologist. He became a member of the French Academy of Sciences in 1931.

Jacob served as the president of the French National Centre for Scientific Research from 1940 to 1944. He encouraged research in nutrition, energy and medicine to ease the impact on daily life by the German occupation.

Jacob was dismissive of democracy and the left-wing Popular Front. He was also critical of judaism and freemasons. He once described Adolf Hitler as "a staunch socialist who went through hard times".

== Death ==
Jacob died in 1962.
