= Pierre Jacquinot =

French physicist

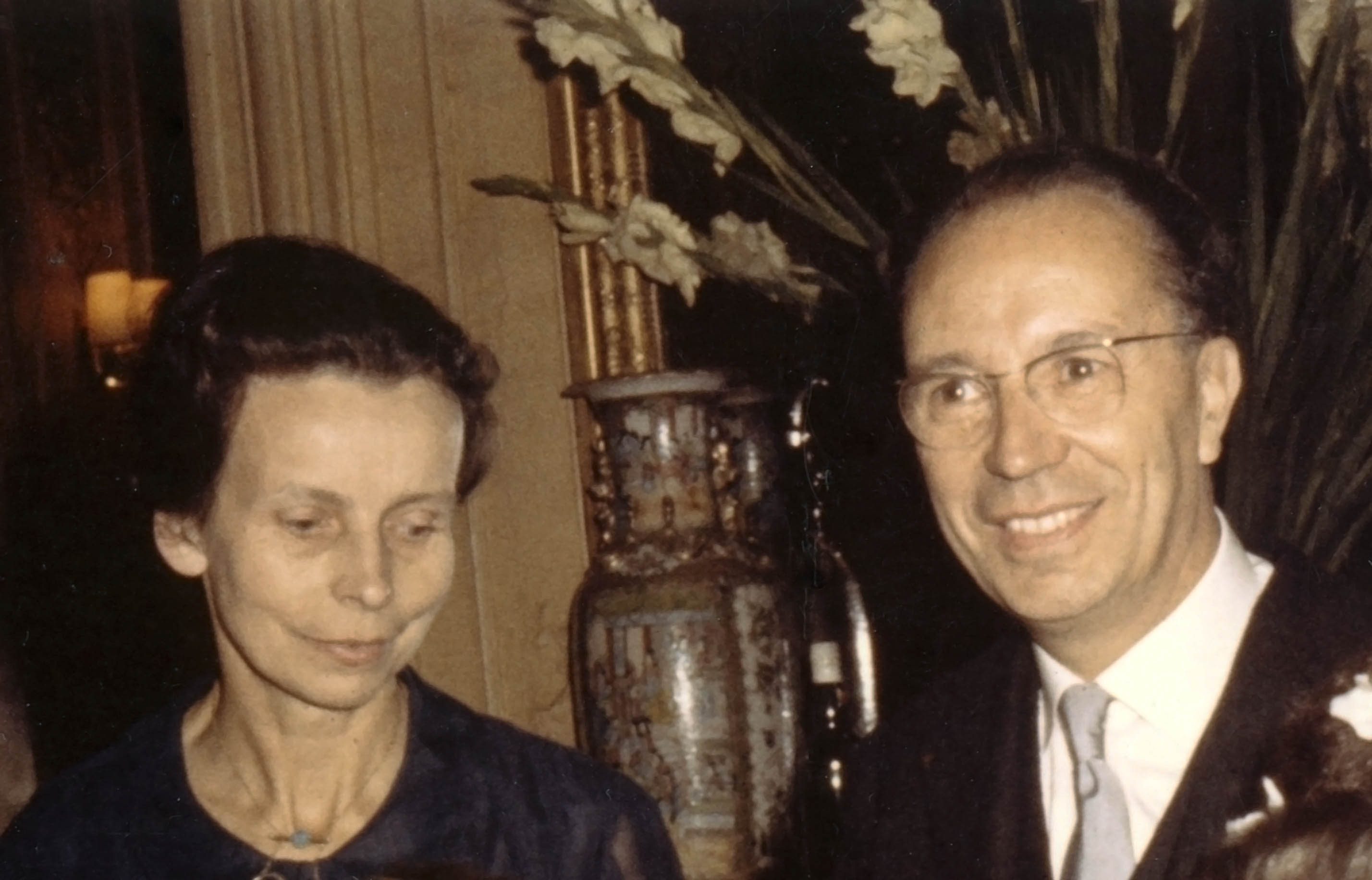
- Pierre Jacquinot (right) and his wife in 1965.
- Born: January 18, 1910
- Died: September 22, 2002 (aged 92)
- Known for: Jacquinot's advantage
- Scientific career
- Fields: Interferometry
- Institutions: Laboratoire Aimé-Cotton
- Doctoral advisor: Aimé Cotton
- Notable students: Janine Connes

Pierre Jacquinot (18 January 1910 – 22 September 2002) was a French physicist.

Jacquinot was a PhD student of Aimé Cotton. He was director of Laboratoire Aimé-Cotton during almost 20 years (1951–1962 and 1969–1978). From 1962 to 1969 he was appointed director general of CNRS.

In the mid-1940s, Jacquinot noticed that a Michelson interferometer could be modified by removing the need of a slit to achieve a higher resolution. This result became known as Jacquinot's advantage, published by Jacquinot in 1954. In Laboratoire Aimé–Cotton, he advised the work of Pierre and Janine Connes who developed the Fourier-transform infrared spectroscopy between 1954 and 1966.

In 1966 he entered the French Academy of Sciences. He became its president from 1980 to 1982.

== Biography ==
Pierre Jacquinot was the son of an officer who was killed in 1916 at the age of 40 . As a student at the Faculty of Sciences in University of Lorraine, he earned a bachelor’s degree in physics in 1930 and ranked first in the agrégation exam in physics in 1932.

A laboratory assistant at the Faculty of Sciences in Nancy from 1931 to 1933, he then moved to Paris, on the advice of François Croze, as a research fellow of the Caisse nationale des sciences at the Laboratoire du grand électro-aimant in Bellevue, where, under the supervision of Aimé Cotton, he prepared a dissertation for a doctorate in physical sciences on the Zeeman effect in intense magnetic fields. He defended his thesis at the Faculty of Sciences of the University of Paris in 1937. He was then appointed research fellow of the National Fund for Scientific Research, and later promoted to senior research fellow in 1941.

The following year, he moved to Clermont-Ferrand, where he was appointed lecturer at the Faculty of Sciences; he served as acting chair of the physics department from 1942 to 1944 and was granted the title of professor without a chair. He returned to Paris in 1946 as a lecturer in physics at the PCB, serving as Jean Laval’s substitute, and was granted a permanent lecturership at the PCB the following year, with Jean-Paul Mathieu taking over as substitute. He was granted the title of professor without a chair in 1950, appointed full professor in his own right in 1952, and became full professor of the Chair of Spectroscopy (established in 1920 for Aimé Cotton; François Croze had previously held the chair) in 1954.

He conducted his research at the Bellevue Large Electromagnet Laboratory, which became the Laboratoire Aimé-Cotton after he became its director in 1951. Under his leadership, Derek Jackson elucidated the fine structure of indium and gallium isotopes, while Pierre Connes and Janine Connes developed Fourier transform spectrometry with their students Hervé Delouis, Guy Guelachvili, Jean-Pierre Maillard, Guy Michel, and Jacques Pinard.

From 1962 to 1969, he served as director general of the CNRS. During that time, he developed the concept of the “associated laboratory.” He then became president of the Institute of Theoretical and Applied Optics (SupOptique), succeeding Alfred Kastler, and was appointed professor at the University of Paris-XI.

He retired from teaching in 1978. From 1980 to 1982, he served as president of the French Academy of Sciences. In 1937, he married Françoise Touchot, known for her monograph on the economy of Lorraine. She died in 1986.

== Awards ==
- 1950: Fernand Holweck Medal and Prize
- 1976: Three Physicists Prize
- 1978: CNRS Gold medal
- 1962: Prix Jaffé
