= French National Centre for Scientific Research =

French research organisation

Centre national de la recherche scientifique
- Formation: 19 October 1939; 87 years ago
- Type: Governmental organisation
- Purpose: Fundamental research
- Headquarters: Campus Gérard Mégie, 16th arrondissement of Paris
- Official language: French
- President: Thierry Dauxois
- Main organ: Comité national de la recherche scientifique
- Budget: €3.8 billion (2021)
- Staff: 33,000 (2021)
- Website: www.cnrs.fr

The French National Centre for Scientific Research (French: Centre national de la recherche scientifique, pronounced [sɑ̃tʁ(ə) nɑsjɔnal də la ʁəʃɛʁʃ(ə) sjɑ̃tifik]; CNRS) is the French state research organisation and is the largest public research body in Europe and the second largest research organisation in the world.

In 2020, it employed over 32,000 staff, including more than 16,000 tenured researchers, 10,000 engineers and technical staff, and 8,000 contractual workers. It is headquartered in Paris and has administrative offices in Brussels, Beijing, Tokyo, Singapore, Washington, D.C., Bonn, Moscow, Tunis, Johannesburg, Santiago de Chile, Israel, and New Delhi.

== Organization ==
The CNRS operates on the basis of research units, which are of two kinds: "proper units" (UPRs) are operated solely by the CNRS, and Joint Research Units (UMRs – French: Unité mixte de recherche) are run in association with other institutions, such as universities or INSERM. Members of Joint Research Units may be either CNRS researchers or university employees (maîtres de conférences or professeurs). Each research unit has a numeric code attached and is typically headed by a university professor or a CNRS research director. A research unit may be subdivided into research groups ("équipes"). The CNRS also has support units, which may, for instance, supply administrative, computing, library, or engineering services.

In 2026, the CNRS had 1100 Joint Research Units in France, 80 international research units and 10 representation offices abroad.

The CNRS is divided into 10 national institutes:

- Institute of Chemistry (INC)
- Institute of Ecology and Environment (INEE)
- Institute of Physics (INP)
- Institute of Nuclear and Particle Physics (IN2P3)
- Institute of Biological Sciences (INSB)
- Institute for Humanities and Social Sciences (INSHS)
- Institute for Computer Sciences (INS2I)
- Institute for Engineering and Systems Sciences (INSIS)
- Institute for Mathematical Sciences (INSMI)
- Institute for Earth Sciences and Astronomy (INSU)

The National Committee for Scientific Research, which is in charge of the recruitment and evaluation of researchers, is divided into 47 sections (e.g. Section 41 is mathematics, Section 7 is computer science and control, and so on). Research groups are affiliated with one primary institute and an optional secondary institute; the researchers themselves belong to one section. For administrative purposes, the CNRS is divided into 18 regional divisions (including four for the Paris region).

== Employment ==
Researchers who are permanent employees of the CNRS, equivalent to lifelong research fellows in English-speaking countries, are classified in two categories, each subdivided into two or three classes, and each class is divided into several pay grades.

Scientist (chargé de recherches)		Senior scientist (directeur de recherche)		
Normal class (CRCN)	Hors classe (CRHC)	Second class (DR2)	First class (DR1)	Exceptional class (DRCE)

In principle, research directors tend to head research groups, but this is not a general rule (a research scientist can head a group or even a laboratory and some research directors do not head a group).

Employees for support activities include research engineers, studies engineers, assistant engineers and technicians. Contrary to what the name would seem to imply, these can have administrative duties (e.g. a secretary can be "technician", an administrative manager of a laboratory an "assistant engineer").

Following a 1983 reform, the candidates selected have the status of civil servants and are part of the public service.

== Recruitment ==
All permanent support employees are recruited through annual nationwide competitive campaigns (concours). Separate competitives campaigns are held in each of the forty disciplinary fields covered by the institution and organized in sections. In the context of the competition, the section is made up of an eligibility jury, which reads the application files, selects some for the orals, holds the orals, and draws up a ranked list of potential candidates, submitted to the admission jury, which validates (or not) this ranking; the admission jury can make adjustments within this list. At the end of the admissions jury, the results are announced.

The competition is governed by very strict, well-defined legal rules, including the sovereignty and impartiality of the jury and the rules governing conflicts of interest: candidates are strictly forbidden to have any contact with a member of the jury, and no one may put pressure on the jury in any way whatsoever. If a member of the jury belongs to the candidate's family, he or she may not sit on the jury. The same applies if a candidate has worked extensively with one of the jury members over the past two years, or has a direct and regular relationship with him or her.

In 2020, the average age at recruitment was 33.9 years for chargés de recherche (research fellows), with wide variations between sections (in the humanities and social sciences, it was 36.3 years).

In 2020, the average recruitment rate was 21.3 applicants for each single open position, again with variations to this rate between sections. The most competitive sections are usually Section 2 (theoretical physics), Section 35 (literature, philosophy and philology), Section 36 (sociology and law), and Section 40 (political science). In 2023, in Section 35, there were 158 applicants for four open positions, hence a recruitment rate of 2.53%. By comparison, Section 12 (molecular chemistry) received 33 applications for five open positions.

== History ==
The CNRS was created on 19 October 1939 by decree of President Albert Lebrun. Since 1954, the centre has annually awarded gold, silver, and bronze medals to French scientists and junior researchers. In 1966, the organisation underwent structural changes, which resulted in the creation of two specialised institutes: the National Astronomy and Geophysics Institute in 1967 (which became the National Institute of Sciences of the Universe in 1985) and the Institut national de physique nucléaire et de physique des particules (IN2P3; English: National Institute of Nuclear and Particle Physics) in 1971.

== Reform proposals ==
The effectiveness of the recruitment, compensation, career management, and evaluation procedures of CNRS have been under scrutiny. Governmental projects include the transformation of the CNRS into an organization allocating support to research projects on an ad hoc basis and the reallocation of CNRS researchers to universities. Another controversial plan advanced by the government involves breaking up the CNRS into six separate institutes. These modifications, which were again proposed in 2021 by think tanks such as the Institut Montaigne, have been massively rejected by French scientists, leading to multiple protests. Important reforms were also recommended in the 2023 assessment report of the HCERES.

== Leadership ==
=== Past presidents ===
- Claude Fréjacques (1981–1989)
- René Pellat (1989–1992)
- Édouard Brézin (1992–2000)
- Gérard Mégie (2000–2004)
- Bernard Meunier (2004–2006)
- Catherine Bréchignac (2006–2010)

=== Past directors general ===
- Jean Mercier (1939–1940)
- Charles Jacob (1940–1944)
- Frédéric Joliot-Curie (1944–1946)
- Georges Teissier (1946–1950)
- Gaston Dupouy (1950–1957)
- Jean Coulomb (1957–1962)
- Pierre Jacquinot (1962–1969)
- Hubert Curien (1969–1973)
- Bernard P. Gregory (1973–1976)
- Robert Chabbal (1976–1980)
- Jacques Ducuing (1979–1981)
- Jean-Jacques Payan (1981–1982)
- Pierre Papon (1982–1986)
- Serge Feneuille (1986–1988)
- François Kourilsky (1988–1994)
- Guy Aubert (1994–1997)
- Catherine Bréchignac (1997–2000)
- Geneviève Berger (2000–2003)
- Bernard Larrouturou (2003–2006)
- Arnold Migus (2006–2010)

==== Past and current president director general (CEO) ====
Alain Fuchs was appointed president on 20 January 2010. His position combined the previous positions of president and director general.

Thierry Dauxois, current CEO of the CNRS

- 2010–2017: Alain Fuchs
- From 24 October 2017 to 24 January 2018 (interim): Anne Peyroche
- From 24 January 2018 to 10 June 2026: Antoine Petit
- Since 10 June 2026: Thierry Dauxois

== Notable people ==
Several of the French Nobel Prize winners were employed by the CNRS, particularly at the start of their careers, and most worked in university laboratories associated with the CNRS.

=== Nobel laureates in Physics ===
- 1966: Alfred Kastler, École normale supérieure (research director at CNRS from 1968 to 1972);
- 1970: Louis Néel, director of the Electrostatics and Metal Physics Laboratory (Grenoble) from 1946 to 1970;
- 1991: Pierre-Gilles de Gennes, Collège de France, Higher School of Industrial Physics and Chemistry;
- 1992: Georges Charpak, Higher School of Industrial Physics and Chemistry and CERN (CNRS researcher from 1948 to 1959);
- 1997: Claude Cohen-Tannoudji, Collège de France and École normale supérieure (CNRS research associate from 1960 to 1962);
- 2007: Albert Fert, CNRS/Thales UMR, jointly with Peter Grünberg (German physicist);
- 2012: Serge Haroche, Collège de France (administrator), University of Paris-VI (from 1975 to 2001), CNRS (from 1967 to 1975).
- 2022: Alain Aspect, CNRS research director emeritus, professor at the École normale supérieure Paris-Saclay, the École polytechnique and the Institut d'optique Graduate School.

=== Nobel laureates in Physiology or Medicine ===
- 2008: Luc Montagnier, Professor Emeritus at the Institut Pasteur, Viral Oncology Unit, honorary research director at the CNRS and member of the Academies of Sciences and Medicine. Price in common with Françoise Barré-Sinoussi and Harald zur Hausen;
- 2011: Jules Hoffmann, Emeritus Research Director, Institute of Molecular and Cellular Biology (University of Strasbourg).

=== Nobel laureates in Chemistry ===
- 1987: Jean-Marie Lehn, University of Strasbourg and Collège de France (CNRS researcher from 1960 to 1966);
- 2016: Jean-Pierre Sauvage, University of Strasbourg (Researcher at CNRS from 1971 to 2014).

=== Fields Medal ===
- Among the French mathematicians who obtained the Fields medal, only Jean-Christophe Yoccoz and Cédric Villani seem never to have been employed by the CNRS (they did, however, work in units associated with the CNRS).
- 1950: Laurent Schwartz, University of Nancy (CNRS scholarship holder from 1940 to 1944 at the University of Toulouse);
- 1954: Jean-Pierre Serre, Collège de France (attached, then in charge, then research professor at the CNRS from 1948 to 1954);
- 1958: René Thom, University of Strasbourg (CNRS researcher from 1946 to 1953??);
- 1966 Alexandre Grothendieck, University of Paris (research associate at CNRS from 1950 to 1953);
- 1982: Alain Connes, Institute of Advanced Scientific Studies (intern, then attached, then research fellow at the CNRS from 1970 to 1974);
- 1994: Pierre-Louis Lions, Paris-Dauphine University (CNRS research associate from 1979 to 1981);
- 2002: Laurent Lafforgue, Institute of Advanced Scientific Studies (CNRS research fellow from 1990 to 2000 at Paris-XI);
- 2006: Wendelin Werner, Paris-Sud 11 University (CNRS research fellow from 1991 to 1997 at Paris-VI then ENS);
- 2014: Artur Ávila, Jussieu Institute of Mathematics -Paris Rive Gauche (research fellow then research director since 2003);
- 2018: Alessio Figalli, who began his career in 2007 at the Jean-Alexandre Dieudonné mathematics laboratory (CNRS-UCA).

=== Other distinctions ===
- 2003: the Business Delegation receives the European Grand Prix for Innovation Awards, European innovation prize for scientific organizations;
- 2003: Jean-Pierre Serre wins the Abel Prize (researcher at the CNRS from 1948 to 1954);
- 2007: Joseph Sifakis, Turing Award (highest distinction in computer science, considered the Nobel Prize in this field). He is research director at the CNRS in the Verimag laboratory which he founded.
- 2025: Le Prix PhiloMonaco de l'Éditeur.

== Ranking ==
Despite being a fundamental science institution, in the Reuters ranking of most innovative institutions, the CNRS was ranked No. 8 worldwide and No. 3 in Europe based on total patents by the institution between 2012 and 2017 that were subsequently granted by patent offices. The Webometrics Ranking of World Universities ranked CNRS third worldwide. In 2025, the CNRS was ranked No. 3 worldwide in the SCImago Institutions Rankings.

== See also ==
- CNRS Gold medal
- CNRS Silver Medal
- Centre pour la communication scientifique directe
- Spanish National Research Council (CSIC), the Spanish counterpart to the CNRS
