= List of companies of France =

Location of France

France is a country whose territory consists of metropolitan France in western Europe, as well as several overseas regions and territories. A member of the Group of 7 (formerly G8) leading industrialised countries, as of 2014, it is ranked as the world's ninth-largest and the EU's second-largest economy by purchasing power parity. With 31 of the 500 biggest companies in the world in 2015, France ranks fourth in the Fortune Global 500, ahead of Germany and the UK. According to the World Trade Organization (WTO), in 2009 France was the world's sixth-largest exporter and the fourth-largest importer of manufactured goods.

French companies have maintained key positions in the insurance and banking industries: Axa is the world's largest insurance company. The leading French banks are BNP Paribas and the Crédit agricole, ranking as the world's largest and sixth-largest banks in 2010 (by assets), while the Société Générale group was ranked the world's eighth-largest in 2009.

For further information on the types of business entities in this country and their abbreviations, see "Business entities in France".

== Largest firms ==
This list shows firms in the Fortune Global 500, which ranks firms by total revenues reported before 31 March 2017. Only the top five firms (if available) are included as a sample.

| Rank | Image | Name | 2016 revenues (US$M) | Employees | Notes |
|---|---|---|---|---|---|
| 25 | | Axa | 143,722 | 97,707 | Paris-based multinational insurance firm diversified into investments and other financial services. Notable subsidiaries include Axa UK, Axa Ireland, Axa PPP Healthcare, Axa Bank Europe, Axa Equitable Life Insurance Company (USA), and Ardian. |
| 30 | | TotalEnergies | 127,925 | 102,168 | Multinational integrated crude oil and natural gas company, including exploration, production, power generation, transportation, refining, marketing, and international oil and product trading. |
| 43 | | BNP Paribas | 109,026 | 184,839 | International banking group and one of the largest banks in the world. Currently serves more than 30 million customers in four primary domestic markets: France, Belgium, Italy and Luxembourg. |
| 67 | | Carrefour | 87,112 | 384,151 | French multinational retailer which operates one of the largest hypermarket chains in the world. The firm is headquartered in Massy, Essonne. |
| 80 | | Crédit Agricole | 80,258 | 70,830 | international full-service banking group based on a network of cooperative and mutual banks. The firm has a historical foundation based in farming. |

== Largest companies by market capitalization ==
The following table lists the largest French companies by market capitalization as of March 2026, based on European Single Electronic Format (ESEF) regulatory filings and share prices from their primary exchange listings.

| Rank | Company | Market cap (billion USD) |
|---|---|---|
| 1 | LVMH | 268.7 |
| 2 | L'Oréal | 212.9 |
| 3 | Hermès | 211.0 |
| 4 | TotalEnergies | 198.8 |
| 5 | Schneider Electric | 158.1 |
| 6 | Safran | 140.7 |
| 7 | Air Liquide | 112.2 |
| 8 | BNP Paribas | 109.0 |
| 9 | Sanofi | 108.6 |
| 10 | EssilorLuxottica | 105.8 |
| 11 | AXA | 92.8 |
| 12 | Vinci | 80.8 |
| 13 | Engie | 80.0 |
| 14 | Thales | 59.1 |
| 15 | Crédit Agricole | 56.5 |
| 16 | Société Générale | 55.2 |
| 17 | Orange | 52.7 |
| 18 | Danone | 51.3 |
| 19 | Legrand | 40.9 |
| 20 | Saint-Gobain | 38.9 |
| 21 | Kering | 33.0 |
| 22 | Dassault Systèmes | 26.8 |
| 23 | Veolia | 26.7 |
| 24 | Bouygues | 22.0 |
| 25 | Publicis | 20.6 |

== Notable firms ==
This list includes notable companies with primary headquarters located in the country. The industry and sector follow the Industry Classification Benchmark taxonomy. Organizations which have ceased operations are included and noted as defunct.

Notable companies Status: P=Private, S=State; A=Active, D=Defunct
| Name | Industry | Sector | Headquarters | Founded | Notes | Status | |
|---|---|---|---|---|---|---|---|
| Aéropostale | Consumer services | Airlines | Toulouse | 1918 | Aviation, defunct 1933 | P | D |
| Aérospatiale-Matra | Industrials | Defense | Paris | 1999 | Military contractor, defunct 2000 | P | D |
| Air France-KLM | Consumer services | Airlines | Tremblay-en-France | 2004 | Aviation | P | A |
| Airbus | Industrials | Aerospace | Toulouse | 1970 | Aeronautical products | P | A |
| Air Liquide | Industrial | Chemical | Paris | 1902 | Industrial gas | P | A |
| Alcatel Submarine Networks | Telecommunications | Telecommunications equipment | Les Ulis | 1994 | Manufacture and installation of submarine cables | P | A |
| Alcatel-Lucent | Technology | Telecommunications equipment | Boulogne-Billancourt | 2006 | Defunct 2016, now part of Nokia (Finland) | P | D |
| Ales Groupe | Consumer goods | Personal products | Paris | 1969 | Cosmetics | P | A |
| Alstom | Industrials | Railroads | Saint-Ouen | 1928 | Railway transport | P | A |
| Alten | Technology | Computer services | Boulogne-Billancourt | 1988 | Information technology and engineering consulting | P | A |
| Altran | Industrials | Business support services | Paris | 1982 | Engineering consulting, part of Capgemini | P | A |
| Amundi | Financials | Asset managers | Paris | 2010 | Asset management | P | A |
| Arianespace | Industrials | Aerospace | Courcouronnes | 1980 | Commercial launch provider, part of ArianeGroup | P | A |
| ArianeGroup | Industrials | Aerospace & defense | Issy-les-Moulineaux | 2015 | Aerospace, defense and security, joint venture between Airbus and Safran | P | A |
| Arkema | Basic materials | Specialty chemicals | Puteaux | 2004 | Specialty materials | P | A |
| Arte | Consumer services | Broadcasting & entertainment | Strasburg | 1991 | French - German television | P | A |
| Astrium | Industrials | Aerospace | Paris | 2006 | Aerospace manufacturer, defunct 2013 | P | D |
| AT Internet | Technology | Internet | Bordeaux | 1995 | Web analytics | P | A |
| Atisreal | Financials | Real estate services | Levallois-Perret | 2003 | Property consultancy, defunct 2009 | P | D |
| Atos | Technology | Software | Bezons | 1988 | Software and IT consulting | P | A |
| Auchan | Consumer services | Food retailers & wholesalers | Croix | 1961 | Retail food, supermarkets | P | A |
| Axa | Financials | Full line insurance | Paris | 1817 | Life, property insurance | P | A |
| Babolat | Consumer goods | Recreational products | Lyon | 1875 | Sports equipment | P | A |
| Baccarat | Consumer goods | Durable household products | Paris | 1764 | Glassware, fine crystal | P | A |
| Banque de l'Indochine | Financials | Banks | Paris | 1875 | Defunct 1974, now part of Crédit Agricole | P | D |
| Banque Populaire | Financials | Banks | Paris | 1878 | Bank, part of Groupe BPCE | P | A |
| Bel Group | Consumer goods | Food products | Paris | 1865 | Cheese | P | A |
| Biscuiterie Saint-Michel | Consumer goods | Food products | Contres | 1905 | Biscuits | P | A |
| BNP Paribas | Financials | Banks | Paris | 1848 | Banking group | P | A |
| Bolloré | Conglomerates | - | Puteaux | 1822 | Logistics, industry | P | A |
| Bonduelle | Consumer goods | Food products | Villeneuve d'Ascq | 1853 | Food | P | A |
| Bouygues Telecom | Telecommunications | Mobile telecommunications | Paris | 1994 | Part of Bouygues | P | A |
| Bouygues | Conglomerates | - | Paris | 1952 | Telecommunications, industrials, travel & leisure | P | A |
| Brittany Ferries | Industrials | Marine transportation | Roscoff | 1972 | Ferries | P | A |
| Bugatti Automobiles | Consumer goods | Automobiles | Molsheim | 1998 | Part of Bugatti Rimac (Croatia) | P | A |
| Bureau Veritas | Industrials | Business support services | Neuilly-sur-Seine | 1828 | Testing, inspection, certification | P | A |
| Canal+ | Consumer services | Broadcasting & entertainment | Issy-les-Moulineaux | 1984 | Television | P | A |
| Capgemini | Industrials | Business support services | Paris | 1967 | Technology consulting | P | A |
| Carrefour | Consumer services | Food retailers & wholesalers | Boulogne-Billancourt | 1958 | Hypermarkets | P | A |
| Cartier | Consumer goods | Clothing & accessories | Saint-Ouen | 1847 | Jewelry, watches | P | A |
| Celio | Consumer services | Apparel retailers | Paris | 1978 | Clothing retailer | P | A |
| Chanel | Consumer goods | Clothing & accessories | Neuilly-sur-Seine | 1909 | Fashion | P | A |
| Christian Dior SE | Consumer goods | Clothing & accessories | Paris | 1946 | Luxury goods | P | A |
| Citroën | Consumer goods | Automobiles | Rueil-Malmaison | 1919 | Car manufacturer, part of Stellantis (Netherlands) | P | A |
| Clarins | Consumer goods | Personal products | Paris | 1954 | Cosmetics | P | A |
| CMA CGM | Industrials | Delivery services | Marseille | 1978 | Shipping | P | A |
| Com One group | Technology | Telecommunications equipment | Cestas | 1987 | | P | D |
| Crédit Agricole | Financials | Banks | Montrouge | 1894 | Banking network | P | A |
| Crédit Commercial de France | Financials | Banks | Paris | 1894 | Commercial bank, now HSBC France part of HSBC (UK) | P | D |
| Crédit Mutuel | Financials | Banks | Paris | 1882 | Banking group | P | A |
| Conforama | Consumer services | Retail | Saint-Priest | 1967 | Europe's second largest home furnishment company | P | A |
| Covivio | Financials | Real estate | Paris | 1998 | Real estate | P | A |
| Crédit Foncier de France | Financials | Banks | Charenton-le-Pont | 1852 | Bank, part of Groupe BPCE | P | A |
| Crédit Lyonnais | Financials | Banks | Paris | 1863 | Defunct, now part of Crédit Agricole | P | D |
| Criteo | Technology | Internet | Paris | 2005 | Online advertising | P | A |
| Danone | Consumer goods | Food products | Paris | 1919 | Food and dairy | P | A |
| Dassault Aviation | Industrials | Aerospace & defense | Saint-Cloud | 1929 | Aircraft manufacturer | P | A |
| Dassault Systèmes | Technology | Software | Vélizy-Villacoublay | 1981 | Software | P | A |
| De Dietrich | Industrials | Industrial machinery | Schiltigheim | 1684 | Chemical industry equipment | P | A |
| Debacq & Cie | Consumer goods | Clothing & accessories | Paris | 1812 | Jewelry, watches | P | A |
| Decathlon | Consumer goods | Clothing & accessories | Villeneuve-d'Ascq | 1976 | Clothing and sportswear | P | A |
| Dexia | Financials | Banks | Paris | 1996 | Franco-Belgian, defunct | P | D |
| Diptyque | Consumer goods | Personal products | Paris | 1961 | Luxury goods | P | A |
| E.Leclerc | Consumer services | Cooperative society | Ivry-sur-Seine | 1948 | Retailer | P | A |
| Edenred | Industrials | Specialized consumer services | Paris | 2010 | Food services and facilities | P | A |
| Éditions Philippe Amaury | Consumer services | Publishing | Boulogne-Billancourt | 1944 | Newspaper, television | P | A |
| EFI Automotive | Consumer goods | Auto parts | Beynost | 1936 | Automotive parts | P | A |
| Eiffage | Industrials | Construction | Asnières-sur-Seine | 1992 | Construction | P | A |
| Électricité de France (EDF) | Utilities | Conventional electricity | Paris | 1946 | Power generation | S | A |
| Elf Aquitaine | Oil & gas | Exploration & production | Courbevoie | 1967 | Merged into TotalEnergies in 2003. | P | D |
| Engie | Utilities | Electricity generation | Courbevoie | 2008 | Merger of Gaz de France and Suez | P | A |
| Eramet | Basic materials | Nonferrous metals | Paris | 1880 | Mining, metals | P | A |
| Essilor | Healthcare | Medical Equipment | Charenton-le-Pont | 1849 | Optical lenses | P | A |
| Eutelsat | Telecommunications | Mobile telecommunications | Paris | 1977 | Satellite provider | P | A |
| Fnac | Consumer services | Specialty retailers | Ivry-sur-Seine | 1954 | Retail chain | P | A |
| Forvia | Consumer goods | Auto parts | Nanterre | 1997 | Automotive parts | P | A |
| Framatome | Nuclear industries | Nuclear engineering | Courbevoie | 1958 | Nuclear reactors | S | A |
| Galeries Lafayette | Consumer services | Broadline retailers | Paris | 1912 | Department store chain | P | A |
| Gandi | Technology | Internet | Paris | 1999 | Domain name registrar | P | A |
| Gecina | Financials | Real estate | Paris | 1959 | Real estate | P | A |
| Genset | Health care | Biotechnology | Paris | 1989 | Defunct 2002, now part of Merck Serono (Germany) | P | D |
| Getlink | Industrials | Transportation services | Paris | 1986 | Infrastructure, operates Channel Tunnel | P | A |
| Groupama | Financials | Full line insurance | Paris | 1900 | Insurance | P | A |
| Groupe BPCE | Financials | Banks | Paris | 2009 | Bank | P | A |
| Groupe Bull | Technology | Computer hardware | Les Clayes-sous-Bois | 1931 | Computer manufacturer | P | A |
| Groupe Casino | Consumer services | Broadline retailer | Saint-Étienne | 1898 | Retailer | P | A |
| Groupe SEB | Consumer goods | Consumer electronics | Ecully | 1857 | Small appliances | P | A |
| Gaumont | Consumer services | Publishing | Paris | 1895 | | P | A |
| Hachette | Consumer services | Publishing | Paris | 1826 | Publisher, part of Lagardère Group | P | A |
| Hachette Filipacchi Médias | Consumer services | Publishing | Paris | 1826 | Magazine publisher, part of Lagardère Group | P | A |
| Havas | Consumer services | Media agencies | Paris | 1968 | Advertising and PR | P | A |
| Hermès | Consumer goods | Clothing & accessories | Paris | 1837 | Luxury goods | P | A |
| Hutchinson SA | Industrials | Diversified industrials | Paris | 1853 | Diversified manufacturing | P | A |
| Iliad SA | Telecommunications | Fixed line telecommunications | Paris | 1990 | Telecom | P | A |
| Imerys | Basic materials | General mining | Paris | 1880 | Mining, industrial minerals | P | A |
| Ipsen | Health care | Pharmaceuticals | Paris | 1929 | Pharmaceuticals | P | A |
| Ipsos | Industrials | Business support services | Paris | 1975 | Market research | P | A |
| JCDecaux | Industrials | Electronic equipment | Neuilly-sur-Seine | 1964 | Display and advertising equipment | P | A |
| Keolis | Consumer services | Travel & tourism | Paris | 2001 | Transport group | P | A |
| Kering | Consumer goods | Clothing & accessories | Paris | 1963 | Luxury goods (formerly known as PPR) | P | A |
| KNDS France | Industrials | Defense | Versailles | 1973 | Weapons manufacturer | P | A |
| La Poste | Industrials | Delivery services | Paris | 1991 | Postal services | P | A |
| Laboratoires Expanscience | Health care | Pharmaceuticals | Paris | 1950 | Pharma and cosmetics | P | A |
| Lacoste | Consumer goods | Clothing & accessories | Paris | 1933 | Clothing | P | A |
| Lactalis | Consumer goods | Food products | Laval | 1933 | Dairy | P | A |
| Lafarge | Industrials | Building materials & fixtures | Paris | 1833 | Construction and concrete, part of Holcim | P | A |
| Lafuma | Consumer goods | Recreational products | Paris | 1930 | Outdoor equipment | P | A |
| Lagardère Group | Consumer services | Broadcasting & entertainment | Paris | 1922 | Media conglomerate | P | A |
| Lancôme | Consumer goods | Personal products | Paris | 1935 | Cosmetics, part of L'Oréal | P | A |
| Le Zèbre | Consumer goods | Automobiles | Suresnes | 1907 | Automobiles, defunct 1931 | P | D |
| L'Oréal | Consumer goods | Personal products | Clichy | 1909 | Cosmetics | P | A |
| Louis Vuitton | Consumer goods | Clothing & accessories | Paris | 1854 | Part of LVMH | P | A |
| LVMH | Consumer goods | Clothing & accessories | Paris | 1987 | Luxury goods group | P | A |
| Maisons du Monde | Consumer goods | Household furnishings | Vertou | 1996 | Furniture and home decor retail | P | A |
| Mandriva | Technology | Software | Paris | 1995 | Software, defunct 2015 | P | D |
| Mane | Basic materials | Specialty chemicals | Le Bar-sur-Loup | 1871 | Flavours, fragrances | P | A |
| Manuloc | Industrials | Logistics | Metz | 1964 | Forklifts | P | D |
| Société nationale maritime Corse Méditerranée | Industrials | Marine transportation | Marseille | 1969 | Ferries, defunct 2015, now Corsica Linea | P | D |
| Matra Marconi Space | Industrials | Aerospace | Toulouse | 1996 | Defunct 2000, now EADS Astrium | P | D |
| Matra | Consumer goods | Automobiles | Romorantin-Lanthenay | 1964 | Defunct 2003, now part of Lagardère Group | P | D |
| Mersen | Industrials | Diversified industrials | Courbevoie | 1891 | Manufacturing | P | A |
| Michelin | Consumer goods | Tires | Clermont-Ferrand | 1889 | Tires | P | A |
| Montagut | Consumer goods | Clothing & accessories | Saint-Sauveur-de-Montagut | 1880 | Clothing | P | A |
| MoonScoop Group | Consumer services | Broadcasting & entertainment | Paris | 2003 | Animation production, defunct 2014 | P | D |
| Motul | Basic materials | Speciality chemicals | Aubervilliers | 1853 | Lubricants | P | A |
| Naval Group | Industrials | Defense | Paris | 1631 | Shipyards | P | A |
| Neoen | Energy | Alternative energy | Paris | 2008 | Renewable energy | P | A |
| Nexans | Industrials | Electrical components | Paris | 2000 | Cable manufacturing | P | A |
| Neyco | Industrials | Diversified industrials | Vanves | 1956 | Vacuum, material and thin film | P | A |
| Norauto | Consumer goods | Auto parts | Lesquin | 1970 | Car parts and repairs | P | A |
| Opella | Health care | Pharmaceuticals | Neuilly-sur-Seine | 2018 | Pharmaceuticals | P | A |
| OPmobility | Consumer goods | Auto parts | Levallois | 1946 | Automotive parts | P | A |
| Orange S.A. | Telecommunications | Mobile telecommunications | Paris | 1988 | Telecom | P | A |
| Orano | Nuclear industries | Nuclear cycle | Courbevoie | 2017 | Uranium, nuclear fuel, nuclear recycling | S | A |
| Oxbow | Consumer goods | Recreational products | Mérignac | 1985 | Sporting goods, part of Lafuma | P | A |
| Panzani | Consumer goods | Food products | Lyon | 1950 | Food | P | A |
| Parrot SA | Consumer goods | Recreational products | Paris | 1994 | Micro-UAVs | P | A |
| Pentalog | Industrials | Business support services | Orléans | 1993 | Offshoring, business support | P | A |
| Pernod Ricard | Consumer goods | Distillers & vintners | Paris | 1975 | Distilled beverages | P | A |
| Peugeot | Consumer goods | Automobiles | Rueil-Malmaison | 1810 | Car manufacturer, part of Stellantis (Netherlands) | P | A |
| PGM Précision | Industrials | Defense | Poisy | 1991 | Firearms | P | A |
| Picard Surgelés | Consumer services | Food retailers & wholesalers | Fontainebleau | 1962 | Frozen food retail | P | A |
| PSA Group | Consumer goods | Automobiles | Rueil-Malmaison | 1976 | Merged with Fiat Chrysler Automobiles to form Stellantis | P | D |
| Publicis | Industrials | Business support services | Paris | 1926 | Marketing and PR | P | A |
| RATP Group | Consumer services | Travel & tourism | Paris | 1948 | Public transport | S | A |
| Renault | Consumer goods | Automobiles | Boulogne-Billancourt | 1899 | Car manufacturer | P | A |
| Renault Trucks | Industrials | Commercial vehicles & trucks | Saint-Priest | 1978 | Trucks | P | A |
| Rexel | Industrials | Electrical components & equipment | Paris | 1967 | Commercial equipment | P | A |
| Rhodia | Basic materials | Specialty chemicals | La Défense | 1998 | Chemicals, part of Solvay S.A. (Belgium) | P | A |
| Rhône-Poulenc | Basic materials | Specialty chemicals | Paris | 1928 | Chemical, merged with Hoechst AG to form Aventis | P | D |
| Robertet | Basic materials | Specialty chemicals | Grasse | 1850 | Fragrances, flavors, natural ingredients | P | A |
| Safran | Industrials | Aerospace | Paris | 2005 | Aircraft engines | P | A |
| Saft | Industrials | Electrical components | Levallois-Perret | 1918 | Batteries | P | A |
| SAGEM | Technology | Telecommunications equipment | Paris | 1924 | Defunct 2005, now Safran | P | D |
| Sagemcom | Technology | Telecommunications equipment | Bois-Colombes | 2007 | Telecommunications equipment | P | A |
| Saint-Gobain | Industrials | Building materials & fixtures | Courbevoie | 1665 | Building materials | P | A |
| Salomon Group | Consumer goods | Recreational products | Épagny-Metz-Tessy | 1947 | Sports equipment | P | A |
| Sanofi | Health care | Pharmaceuticals | Paris | 2004 | Formed by merger of Sanofi-Synthélabo and Aventis (the original incarnation of Sanofi was established in 1973) | P | A |
| Savencia | Consumer goods | Food products | Viroflay | 1956 | Food and dairy | P | A |
| Schneider Electric | Industrials | Electrical components & equipment | Rueil-Malmaison | 1836 | Energy and automation equipment | P | A |
| SCOR SE | Financials | Reinsurance | Paris | 1970 | Reinsurance | P | A |
| SDV International Logistics | Industrials | Delivery services | Puteaux | 1885 | Logistics | P | A |
| Sephora | Consumer services | Specialty retailers | Paris | 1969 | Cosmetic retailer | P | A |
| Servier | Health care | Pharmaceuticals | Suresnes | 1954 | Pharmaceuticals | P | A |
| SFR | Telecommunications | Fixed line telecommunications | Paris | 1987 | Telecom, ISP, owned by Altice | P | A |
| Sigfox | Technology | Telecommunications equipment | Labège | 2009 | Wireless devices | P | A |
| SNCF | Consumer services | Travel & tourism | Saint-Denis | 1938 | Passenger rail | S | A |
| Snecma | Industrials | Aerospace | Courcouronnes | 1945 | Engines, part of Safran | P | A |
| Société Bic | Consumer goods | Nondurable household products | Clichy | 1945 | Consumer goods | P | A |
| Société Générale | Financials | Banks | Nanterre | 1864 | Banking and financial services | P | A |
| Sodexo | Industrials | Specialized consumer services | Issy-les-Moulineaux | 1966 | Food services and facilities | P | A |
| Sogeti | Technology | Software | Paris | 2002 | IT consulting, part of Capgemini | P | A |
| Soitec | Technology | Electronic Components | Bernin | 1992 | Manufactures substrates used in the manufacturing of semiconductors | P | A |
| Sopra Steria | Technology | Software | Annecy | 1968 | Consulting and development | P | A |
| Suez | Utilities | Multiutilities | Paris | 1997 | Utilities, defunct 2008 | P | D |
| Technicolor SA | Consumer services | Broadcasting & entertainment | Issy-les-Moulineaux | 1893 | Media support | P | A |
| Technip | Industrials | Business support services | Paris | 1958 | Business support, merged into TechnipFMC (UK) | P | D |
| TF1 Group | Consumer services | Broadcasting & entertainment | Boulogne-Billancourt | 1987 | Media holdings | P | A |
| Thales Group | Industrials | Aerospace | La Défense | 2000 | Aerospace electrical | P | A |
| Thomson-CSF | Industrials | Defense | Paris | 1879 | Merged into Thales Group | P | D |
| TotalEnergies | Oil & gas | Integrated oil & gas | Courbevoie | 1924 | Petrolueum | P | A |
| Valeo | Consumer goods | Auto parts | Paris | 1923 | Automotive parts | P | A |
| Vallourec | Basic materials | Metal fabricating | Meudon | 1957 | Steel pipes | P | A |
| Valneva | Health care | Biotechnology | Saint-Herblain | 2013 | Vaccines | P | A |
| Veolia | Utilities | Water | Paris | 1853 | Water utilities and treatment | P | A |
| Vinci SA | Industrials | Heavy construction | Rueil-Malmaison | 1899 | Construction | P | A |
| Viseo | Consumer services | Software and computer services | Boulogne-Billancourt | 1999 | IT consulting | P | A |
| Vivendi | Consumer services | Broadcasting & entertainment | Paris | 1853 | Mass media | P | A |
| Waterman | Consumer goods | Nondurable household products | Paris | 1884 | Pens, part of Sanford L.P. (US) | P | A |
| Yoplait | Consumer goods | Food products | Boulogne-Billancourt | 1965 | Yogurt | P | A |
| Yves Rocher | Consumer goods | Personal products | Rennes | 1965 | Cosmetics | P | A |

== See also ==
- Indices of French companies
  - CAC 40
  - CAC Next 20
  - CAC Small
  - CAC All-Tradable
  - SBF 120
- Euronext – the major French stock market
