= CAC All-Tradable =

French stock market index

The CAC All-Tradable is a French stock market index representing all sectors of the French economy. This index replaced SBF 250 (Société des Bourses Françaises 250 Index) on March 21, 2011. SBF 250 was launched on December 31, 1990, and its base value is 1,000.

The CAC All-Tradable is calculated twice a day (at opening and at closing). It contains all the component stocks of the SBF 120 Index.

== See also ==
- List of French companies
- CAC 40
- CAC Next 20
- CAC Mid 60
- CAC Small
