= List of shopping malls in France =

This is a list of shopping malls in France.

The two largest and most visited shopping malls of France are Les Quatre Temps in La Défense near Paris, and La Part-Dieu in Lyon which is going to be extended of 32,000 m² in 2020 and become the largest shopping mall of France.

Name of the mall	City / Location	Department	Region	Size GLA m²	Annual visitors	Owner
Aéroville	Roissy Charles de Gaulle Airport	Seine-Saint-Denis	Île-de-France	84,000	—	Unibail-Rodamco-Westfield
Les Arcades	Noisy-le-Grand	Seine-Saint-Denis	Île-de-France	56,000	12,500,000	—
L'Atoll	Beaucouzé, Angers	Maine-et-Loire	Pays de la Loire	71,000	6,500,000	Compagnie de Phalsbourg
Avenir (shopping mall)	Drancy	Seine-Saint-Denis	Île-de-France	32,900	—	—
Bercy Village	Paris, 12th arrondissement	Paris	Île-de-France	23,000	—	Altarea Cogedim
Bay 1 Loisirs	Torcy	Seine-et-Marne	Île-de-France	32,400	—	Unibail-Rodamco-Westfield
Bay 2	Collégien	Seine-et-Marne	Île-de-France	63,900	—	Unibail-Rodamco-Westfield
Belle Épine	Thiais	Val-de-Marne	Île-de-France	106,000 m^{2} (1,140,000 sq ft)	18,000,000	Ségécé
Bercy 2	Charenton-le-Pont	Val-de-Marne	Île-de-France	36,000	—	Hammerson
Carré Sénart	Sénart	Seine-et-Marne	Île-de-France	118,600	14,000,000	Unibail-Rodamco-Westfield
Domus	Rosny-sous-Bois	Seine-Saint-Denis	Île-de-France	62,000	—	—
Chelles 2	Chelles	Seine-et-Marne	Île-de-France	54,000	—	Société des Centres Commerciaux
La Croix Blanche	Sainte-Geneviève-des-Bois, Fleury-Mérogis	Essonne	Île-de-France	6,600	—	—
Carrousel du Louvre	Paris, 1st arrondissement	Paris	Île-de-France	10,200	—	Unibail-Rodamco-Westfield
Créteil Soleil	Créteil	Val-de-Marne	Île-de-France	124,100	21,000,000 (2017)	Ségécé
Évry 2	Évry	Essonne	Île-de-France	93,700	21,000,000	Société des Centres Commerciaux
Forum des Halles	Paris, 1st arrondissement	Paris	Île-de-France	75,000 m^{2} (810,000 sq ft)	33,900,000 (2017)	Unibail-Rodamco-Westfield
Italie 2	Paris, 13th arrondissement	Paris	Île-de-France	56,000 m^{2} (600,000 sq ft)	—	Hammerson
O'Parinor	Aulnay-sous-Bois	Seine-Saint-Denis	Île-de-France	90,000 m^{2} (970,000 sq ft)	—	—
Parly 2	Le Chesnay	Yvelines	Île-de-France	117,000 m^{2} (1,260,000 sq ft)	13,000,000 (2012)	Unibail-Rodamco-Westfield
Les Quatre Temps	La Défense	Hauts-de-Seine	Île-de-France	139,400 m^{2} (1,500,000 sq ft)	42,000,000 (2017)	Unibail-Rodamco-Westfield
Rosny 2	Rosny-sous-Bois	Seine-Saint-Denis	Île-de-France	111,600 m^{2} (1,201,000 sq ft)	14,600,000 (2012)	Unibail-Rodamco-Westfield
Les 3 Fontaines	Cergy	Val-d'Oise	Île-de-France	64,000	—	Hammerson
Ulis 2	Les Ulis	Essonne	Île-de-France	47,600 m^{2} (512,000 sq ft)	6,200,000 (2012)	Unibail-Rodamco-Westfield, Carrefour, C&A
Vélizy 2	Vélizy-Villacoublay	Yvelines	Île-de-France	108,000 m^{2} (1,160,000 sq ft)	15,300,000 (2012)	Unibail-Rodamco-Westfield
Val d'Europe	Marne-la-Vallée, Serris	Seine-et-Marne	Île-de-France	98,400 m^{2} (1,059,000 sq ft)	18,000,000	Ségécé
Villebon 2	Villebon-sur-Yvette	Essonne	Île-de-France	60,000	—	Immochan, Hammerson
Cap Emeraude	Bourg-en-Bresse	Ain	Auvergne-Rhône-Alpes	41,200	—	—
Courier	Annecy	Haute-Savoie	Auvergne-Rhône-Alpes	—	—	—
Centre Deux	Saint-Étienne	Loire	Auvergne-Rhône-Alpes	24,200	—	Corio, Auchan, Société des Centres Commerciaux, C&A
Le Grand Épagny	Épagny	Haute-Savoie	Auvergne-Rhône-Alpes	—	8,000,000	Corio, Auchan, Société des Centres Commerciaux, C&A
La Caserne de Bonne	Grenoble	Isère	Auvergne-Rhône-Alpes	—	—	—
Comboire	Echirolles	Isère	Auvergne-Rhône-Alpes	—	—	—
Grand'Place	Grenoble	Isère	Auvergne-Rhône-Alpes	55,400	—	Corio
La Part-Dieu	Lyon, 3rd arrondissement	Rhône	Auvergne-Rhône-Alpes	161,000 m^{2} (1,730,000 sq ft)	35,600,000 (2017)	Unibail-Rodamco-Westfield
Avignon Nord	Le Pontet	Vaucluse	Provence-Alpes-Côte d'Azur	—	—	—
Cap 3000	Saint-Laurent-du-Var	Alpes-Maritimes	Provence-Alpes-Côte d'Azur	65,052	8,000,000	Altarea, ABP, Predica
Grand Var	La Garde, La Valette-du-Var	Var	Provence-Alpes-Côte d'Azur	—	—	—
La Foux	Gassin	Var	Provence-Alpes-Côte d'Azur	12,700 m²	—	Mercialys
Mayol	Toulon	Var	Provence-Alpes-Côte d'Azur	—	—	ING Real Estate
Les Terrasses du Port	Marseille	Bouches-du-Rhône	Provence-Alpes-Côte d'Azur	54,000 m^{2} (580,000 sq ft)	13,000,000	—
Nice Lingostière	Nice	Alpes-Maritimes	Provence-Alpes-Côte d'Azur	14,809	—	—
Plan de Campagne	Les Pennes-Mirabeau, Cabriès	Bouches-du-Rhône	Provence-Alpes-Côte d'Azur	200,000 m^{2} (2,200,000 sq ft) (retail area including 3 shopping malls)	—	—
