= CAC Small =

French small-cap stock market index

The CAC Small (formerly the CAC Small 90) is a stock market index used by the Paris Bourse. It is a small-cap index which represents all main-market French equities not included in the CAC 40, the CAC Next 20 or the CAC Mid 60. Together, these 4 indices make up the CAC All-Tradable. Originally consisting of 90 listings, the index was revamped to include a wider range of stocks in March 2011.

== Index composition ==
As of 27 November 2019, the index was composed of the following 179 companies:

- 2CRSI
- AST Groupe
- AB Science
- ABC Arbitrage
- ABEO
- Abionyx Pharma SA
- Abivax
- Acteos
- ACTIA Group
- ADLPartner
- Adocia
- AdUx
- Advenis
- Advicenne
- Afone Participations
- AKKA Technologies SE
- AKWEL
- Albioma
- Compagnie des Alpes
- Altur Investissement
- Amoéba
- Amplitude Surgical
- Antalis
- ARCHOS
- Artmarket.com
- Atari SA
- Ateme
- Aubay
- Aurea
- Aures Technologies
- Avenir Telecom S.A.
- AwoX
- Axway Software
- Balyo
- Bastide Le Confort Médical
- Le Bélier
- Bénéteau
- Bigben Interactive
- BOIRON
- Bonduelle
- BOURBON Corporation
- Business & Decision
- Capelli
- Carmila
- Cast
- Catana Group
- Catering International Services
- Chargeurs
- Cibox Inter@ctive
- Claranova
- Cogelec
- CS Group
- Dalet
- Dedalus France
- Delta Plus Group
- Derichebourg
- Devoteam
- DMS (Diagnostic Medical Systems)
- Egide
- Ekinops
- ENGIE EPS
- EOS imaging
- ERYTECH Pharma
- ESI Group
- Esso S.A.F.
- EuropaCorp
- Fermentalg
- FFP
- Figeac Aéro
- Foncière Paris Nord
- La Française de l'Energie
- GEA (Grenobloise d'Electronique et d'Automatismes)
- GECI International
- Generix Group
- Genkyotex
- Genomic Vision
- GenSight Biologics
- GL events
- Groupe CRIT
- Groupe Flo
- Groupe Gorgé
- Groupe Open
- Groupe SFPI
- Guerbet
- Guillemot Corporation
- Haulotte Group
- Hexaom
- HighCo
- HiPay Group
- Hopscotch Groupe
- ID Logistics Group
- IGE+XAO
- Immobilière Dassault
- Infotel
- Innate Pharma
- Innelec Multimédia
- Interparfums
- Inventiva
- IT Link
- Itesoft
- ITS Group
- Jacques Bogart
- Jacquet Metal Service
- Kaufman & Broad
- Keyrus
- Lacroix
- Latécoère
- Lectra
- Linedata Services
- LISI
- LNA Santé
- LUMIBIRD
- Lysogene
- Manitou Group
- Mauna Kea Technologies
- Maurel & Prom
- Marie Brizard Wine & Spirits
- McPhy Energy
- Media 6
- Mediawan
- Memscap
- Mersen
- METabolic EXplorer
- Micropole
- Nanobiotix
- Navya
- Neoen
- Netgem
- Nicox
- Oeneo
- Olympique Lyonnais Groupe
- Onxeo
- Orapi
- Orchestra-Prémaman
- OSE Immunotherapeutics
- Paragon ID
- Passat
- Pharmagest Interactive
- Pierre & Vacances
- Pixium Vision
- Plastiques du Val-de-Loire
- Poxel
- Prodways Group
- Prologue
- PSB Industries
- Recyclex
- Riber
- Robertet
- Société Centrale des Bois et Scieries de la Manche
- Séché Environnement
- SergeFerrari Group
- SES-imagotag
- SRP Groupe
- Signaux Girod
- SII
- SMCP S.A
- Société Marseillaise du Tunnel Prado-Carénage
- Sogeclair S.A
- SoLocal Group
- Spir Communication
- SQLI
- Stef
- Sword Group
- Synergie
- Technicolor
- Tikehau Capital
- TOUAX SCA
- Tour Eiffel (Société de la)
- Transgene
- Union Financière de France Banque
- Union Technologies Informatique Group
- Valneva SE
- Verimatrix
- Vilmorin & Cie
- Voluntis
- Wavestone
- X-FAB Silicon Foundries SE
- Xilam Animation
- Ymagis

== See also ==
- CAC 40
- CAC Next 20
- CAC Mid 60
- CAC All-Tradable
