= BOE Technology =

Chinese electronics company

BOE Technology Group

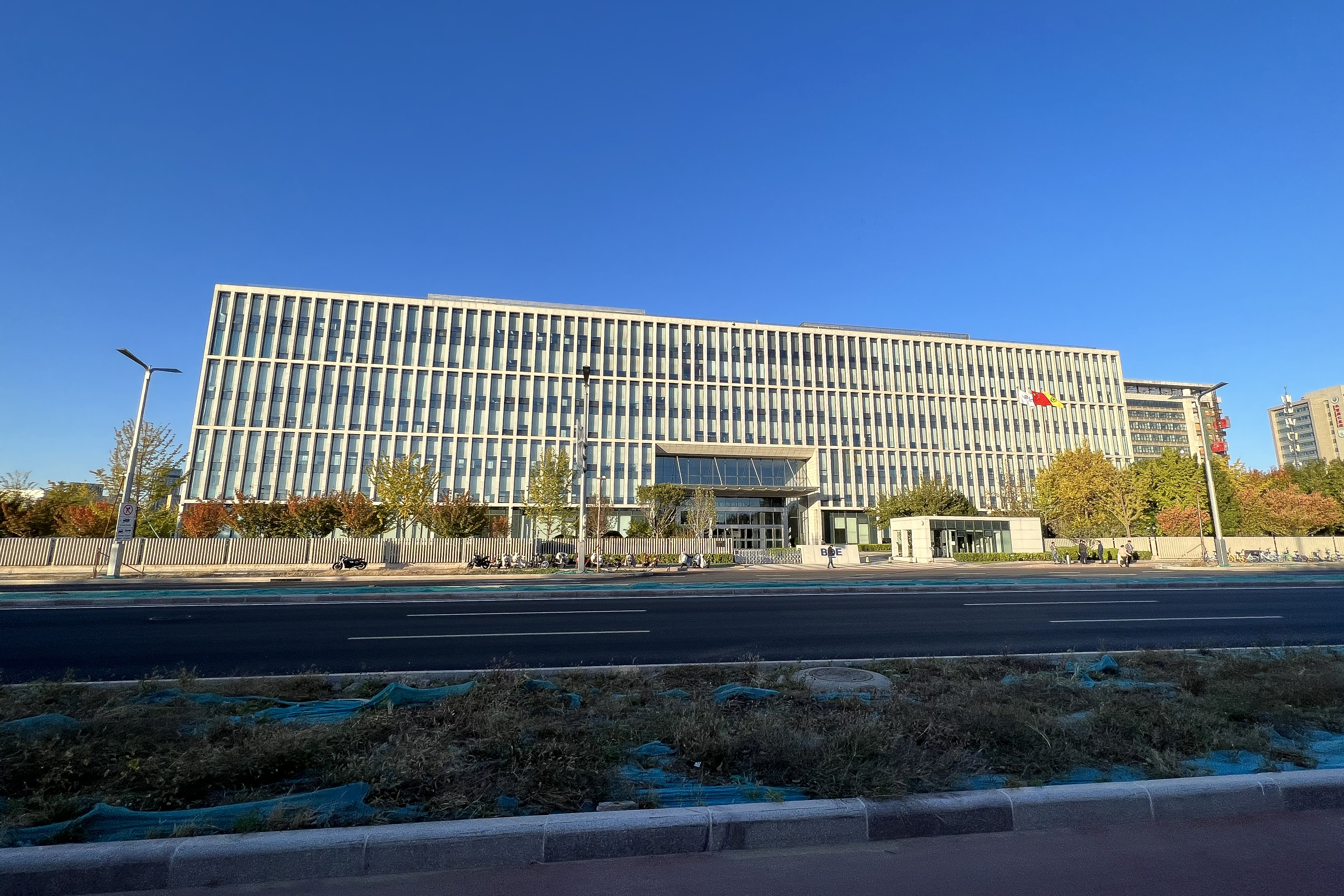
- Headquarters
- Native name: 京东方科技集团股份有限公司
- Formerly: Beijing Oriental Electronics Group (1993–2001)
- Company type: Public
- Traded as: SZSE: 000725 (A share); SZSE: 200725 (B share); CSI A50
- Industry: Electronics; Health care; Internet of things; Photovoltaics
- Founded: April 1993; 33 years ago
- Founder: Wang Dongsheng
- Headquarters: Beijing, China
- Area served: Worldwide
- Key people: Chen Yanshun (Chairman); Gao Wenbao (President)
- Products: LCDs; OLEDs; Flexible displays; MicroLEDs; Fingerprint sensors; Optoelectronic sensors; Solar panels
- Operating income: ▼CN¥174.54 billion (2023)
- Net income: ▲CN¥369.87 million (2023)
- Total assets: ▼CN¥419.19 billion (2023)
- Total equity: ▼CN¥197.80 billion (2023)
- Number of employees: 90,563 (2023)
- Subsidiaries: SES-imagotag; Varitronix
- Website: www.boe.com

BOE Technology
- Simplified Chinese: 京东方科技集团股份有限公司
- Traditional Chinese: 京東方科技集團股份有限公司
Transcriptions
Standard Mandarin
- Hanyu Pinyin: Jīngdōngfāng Kējì Jítuán Gǔfèn Yǒuxiàn Gōngsī

BOE Technology Group Co., Ltd., or Jingdongfang (Chinese: 京东方科技集团股份有限公司), is a Chinese electronic components producer founded in April 1993. Its core businesses are interface devices, smart IoT systems and smart medicine and engineering integration. BOE is one of the world's largest manufacturers of LCD, OLEDs and flexible displays.

== History ==
The company's predecessor was a state-owned enterprise, Beijing Electron Tube Factory. In April 1993, Beijing Oriental Electronics Group Co., Ltd was founded by Wang Dongsheng. In 1997, it listed B shares on the Shenzhen Stock Exchange. In 2001, Beijing Oriental Electronics was renamed BOE Technology Group Co., Ltd. BOE acquired SK Hynix's STN-LCD and OLED businesses for US$22.5 million. Issued additional A shares in Shenzhen Stock Exchange. In 2003, BOE acquired SK Hynix's Hydis flat-panel display businesses for US$380 million.

BOE built China's second 5th generation LCD production line in Beijing's Yizhuang Special Development Zone. The production line was technologically advanced for the time and costly. China Development Bank and the Beijing city government assembled a group of nine banks to loan BOE US$740 million. The Beijing City government provided a further loan of 280 RMB, which it converted to shares of the company and sold for a substantial profit.

In 2008, Hefei's local government spent US$3.5 billion for a controlling ownership stake in BOE.

In 2009, BOE Energy Technology Co., Ltd was founded to enter the photovoltaics industry. In 2010, BOE acquired Suzhou Gaochuang Electronics' Taipei Display Research Center and AIO Manufacturing Plant. BOE also acquired K-Tronics for an undisclosed amount.

In 2011, BOE established a Japan branch and R&D center in Tokyo. In 2012, BOE established an American branch and R&D center in Santa Clara in Silicon Valley, California. In 2014, BOE established a subsidiary in Frankfurt, Germany. In 2015, BOE acquired OASIS International Hospital.

In 2016, BOE acquired automotive displays maker Varitronix for RMB60.1 million. It set up a subsidiary in New Delhi, India.

In 2017, BOE established its Middle East Branch in Dubai and set up a subsidiary based in São Paulo, Brazil. BOE also announced its plan to build a hospital in Chengdu which will be opened in late 2020. BOE announced a long-term agreement with Universal Display Corporation, UDC will supply phosphorescent OLED materials to BOE. According to IHS Markit, BOE became shipped the most displays larger-than-9-inch for tablets, notebook PCs and monitors. However LG Display still lead in terms of area shipment.

In 2018, BOE acquired SES-imagotag for €200 million. BOE formed a joint venture with Kopin Corporation and Olightek for OLED micro-displays manufacturing. BOE established subsidiares in Jakarta, Indonesia and Johannesburg, South Africa. According to Sigmaintell Consulting, BOE overtook LG Display as the world's largest LCD TV and monitor producer with 54.3 million TV panels and 37.3 million monitor panels shipped. The Huawei Mate 20 Pro is the first flagship tier smartphone with an AMOLED sourced from BOE (also sourced from LG Display).

In 2019, BOE formed a joint venture with Rohinni for MicroLED and mini LED backlighting manufacturing. Hisense announced its U9E TVs featuring dual LCD panels which Hisense said exceeds OLED TVs in brightness, color gamut and color accuracy. Its panels are produced by BOE. The Huawei Mate X scheduled for release in Q4 2019 reportly has a foldable OLED from BOE. According to IHS Markets, BOE had the second highest marketshare of the smartphone OLED panel market at 5.9%, only behind Samsung Displays. BOE will also surpass LG Display as the world's largest flat-panel display producer. And BOE has partnered with Huawei to research cameras under OLEDs. BOE is reportedly in talks to replace LG Display and Tianma as OLED supplier for LG Electronics smartphones in 2020. BOE also became an OLED supplier for Apple beginning in 2021 for the iPhone.

On February 1, 2022, the company announced they had developed the world's fastest gaming monitor with a 500 Hz refresh rate. The prototype 27-inch monitor has a resolution of 1080p. In 2023, the company was reportedly predicted to become the largest supplier of OLED display panels for the Apple iPhone 15 series according to Ming-Chi Kuo, a Taiwanese Apple analyst at TF International Security. On August 15, 2025, BOE faced a ban on its products' sale in the US after it lost a lawsuit filed by Samsung. The United States International Trade Commission has ruled to ban import of BOE's OLED panels into the US for the next 14 years and 8 months.

In July 2025, a proposed National Defense Authorization Act named BOE for the United States Department of Defense to examine whether the company merits inclusion on a list of "Chinese military companies." In June 2026, the US Department of Defense added BOE to a list of Chinese military-linked companies.

== Competitive position ==
In the 2020s, China became the largest manufacturer of LCDs and Chinese firms had a 40% share of the global market. BOE is among the leading Chinese firms during this period. Local governments had a significant role in this growth, including as a result of their investments in LCD manufacturers via state-owned investment companies. As of the third quarter of 2020, BOE's six largest investors were state-owned companies from Beijing, Chongqing, and Hefei, which together owned a combined 23.8% share of BOE.

In 2023, the World Intellectual Property Organization (WIPO)'s Annual PCT Review ranked BOE Technology's number of patent applications published under the PCT System as 5th in the world, with 2,152 patent applications being published during 2023.

BOE Technology is one of the world's leading manufacturers of semiconductor products for telecommunications. It is also the world's largest manufacturer of liquid crystal displays, organic light-emitting diodes, and flexible displays, as of at least 2023.

== Operations ==
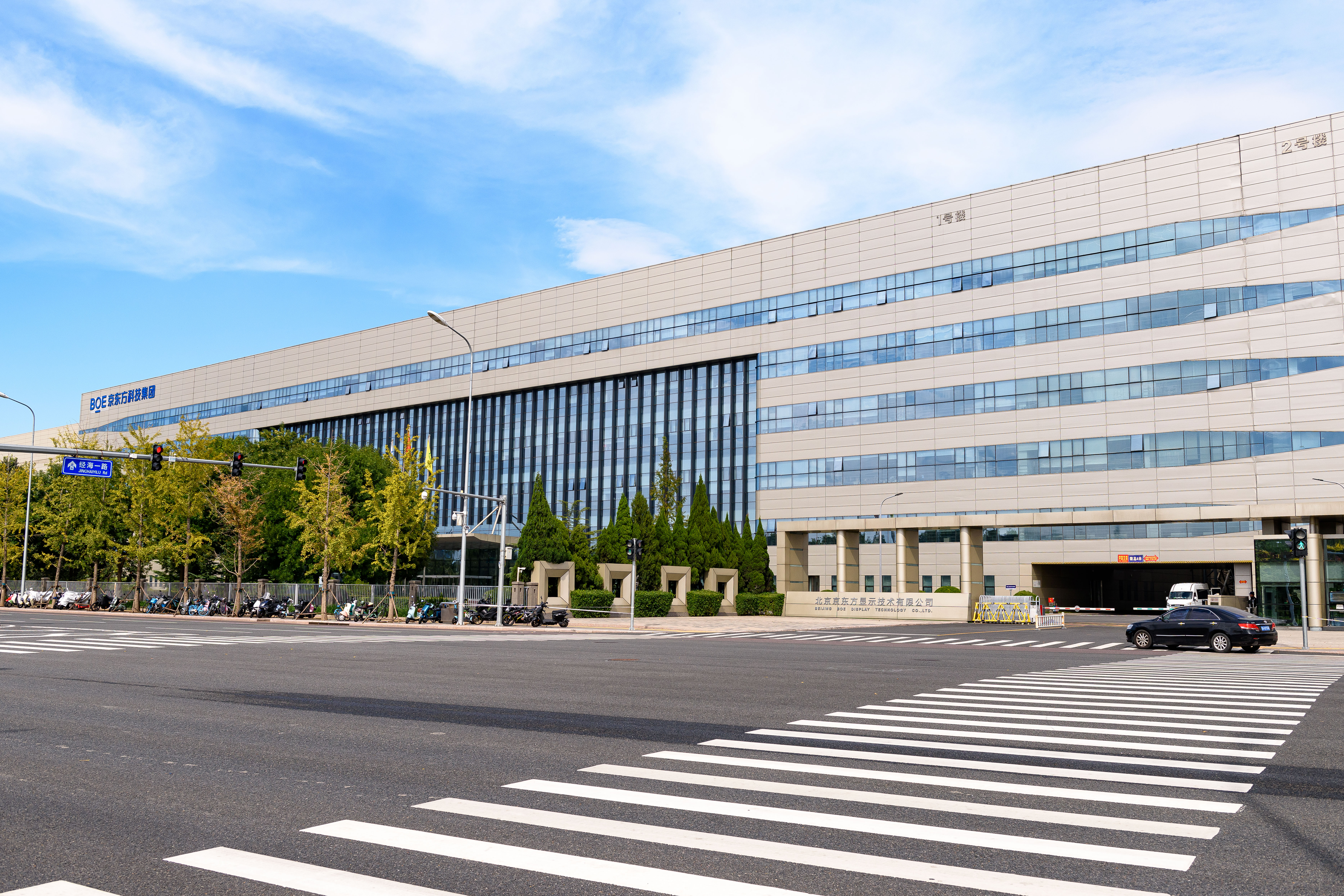
Factory of BOE in Beijing

BOE has manufacturing facilities located in Beijing, Hefei, Chengdu, Chongqing, Fuzhou, Mianyang, Wuhan, Kunming, Suzhou, Ordos and Gu'an. BOE has global marketing and R&D centers in 19 countries, such as Japan, South Korea, Singapore, the United States, Germany, the United Kingdom, France, Switzerland, India, Russia, Brazil and Dubai.

In Hefei, BOE has three production lines as of at least 2024. These production lines have helped the city attract further business in the electronics supply chain and have contributed to the city becoming one of China's main centers in the optoelectronic display industry.

BOE fabrication plants
Code	Gen	Location	Technology	Current status	Ramp-up year
B1	5	Beijing	a-Si	Mass production	2005
B2	4	Chengdu	a-Si	Mass production	2009
B3	6	Hefei	a-Si/oxide	Mass production	2010
B4	8	Beijing	a-Si	Mass production	2011
B5	8	Hefei	a-Si/oxide/OLED	Mass production	2014
B6	5.5	Ordos City	LTPS/AMOLED	Mass production	2014
B7	6	Chengdu	AMOLED	Mass production	2018
B8	8	Chongqing	a-Si/oxide	Mass production	2015
B9	10.5	Hefei	a-Si/oxide	Mass production	2018
B10	8	Fuqing	a-Si	Under ramping up	2017
B11	6	Mianyang	LTPS/AMOLED	Mass production	2019
B12	8	Dalian	a-Si	Planning	BOE also considering second Gen 10.5 fab
B13	8	Chongqing	LTPS/AMOLED	Under construction	
