= List of largest French companies =

This article lists the largest companies in France in terms of their revenue, net profit and total assets, according to the American business magazines Fortune and Forbes, as well as data from Global Database, a UK-based provider of B2B company information and business intelligence.

== 2024 Global Database list ==
This list displays the Top 5 public companies in France ranked by their annual revenue for the fiscal year 2024. The figures are given in millions of US dollars. Also included are each company’s net profit, number of employees worldwide, headquarters location, and industry sector. The data is sourced from Global Database, a UK-based B2B company information and business intelligence provider.

Rank	Name	Industry	Revenue (USD millions)	Profits (USD millions)	Employees	Headquarters
1	TotalEnergies	Oil and gas	237,100	21,510	102,579	Courbevoie
2	Électricité de France	Electric utility	146,000	11,000	171,862	Paris
3	AXA	Insurance	109,000	7,800	153,000	Paris
4	Carrefour	Retail	89,000	1,175	320,000	Boulogne-Billancourt
5	LVMH	Luxury goods	88,700	13,000	175,000	Paris

== 2024 Fortune list ==
This list displays all 24 French companies in the Fortune Global 500, which ranks the world's largest companies by annual revenue. The figures below are given in millions of US dollars and are for the fiscal year 2023. Also listed are the headquarters location, net profit, number of employees worldwide and industry sector of each company.

Rank	Fortune 500 rank	Name	Industry	Revenue (USD millions)	Profits (USD millions)	Employees	Headquarters
1	20	TotalEnergies	Oil and gas	218,945	21,384	102,579	Courbevoie
2	49	Électricité de France	Electric utility	151,040	10,828	171,862	Paris
3	64	BNP Paribas	Banking	136,073	11,864	182,656	Paris
4	104	Société Générale	Banking	99,163	2,695	124,089	Paris
5	118	Crédit Agricole	Banking	93,358	6,863	75,125	Paris
6	119	Dior - LVMH	Apparel	93,137	6,815	197,141	Paris
7	122	Carrefour	Retail	91,790	1,794	305,333	Massy
8	126	Axa	Insurance	90,406	7,772	94,705	Paris
9	130	Engie	Electric utility	89,258	2,387	97,297	Courbevoie
10	166	Vinci	Construction	75,551	5,083	279,426	Nanterre
11	174	Groupe BPCE	Banking	73,775	3,031	97,835	Paris
12	225	Bouygues	Conglomerate	60,600	1,124	201,498	Paris
13	251	Peugeot	Automotive	56,622	2,376	105,497	Rueil-Malmaison
14	284	Saint-Gobain	Construction	51,830	2,918	144,422	Courbevoie
15	297	Sanofi	Pharmaceuticals	50,209	5,939	86,088	Paris
16	308	Veolia	Utilities	49,028	1,013	218,288	Aubervilliers
17	320	Orange	Telecommunication	47,699	2,638	127,109	Paris
18	337	Crédit Mutuel	Banking	45,490	4,261	77,283	Paris
19	341	SNCF	Transportation	45,145	1,416	282,786	Saint Denis
20	348	L'Oréal	Consumer goods	44,521	6,685	94,605	Clichy
21	387	Schneider Electric	Technology	38,812	4,328	168,044	Rueil-Malmaison
22	409	La Poste	Transportation	36,812	4,328	232,726	Paris
23	431	Auchan	Retail	34,539	−410	145,025	Croix
24	401	Air France-KLM	Airline	32,452	1,010	76,271	Paris

== 2019 Forbes list ==
This list is based on the Forbes Global 2000, which ranks the world's 2,000 largest publicly traded companies. The Forbes list takes into account a multitude of factors, including the revenue, net profit, total assets and market value of each company; each factor is given a weighted rank in terms of importance when considering the overall ranking. The table below also lists the headquarters location and industry sector of each company. The figures are in billions of US dollars and are for the year 2018. All 57 French companies in the Forbes 2000 are listed.

Rank	Fortune 2000 rank	Name	Headquarters	Revenue (USD billions)	Profits (USD billions)	Total Assets (USD billions)	Market Value (USD billions)	Industry
1	25	Total	Courbevoie	184.2	11.4	256.8	149.5	Oil and gas
2	34	BNP Paribas	Paris	101.6	8.4	2,333.0	68.7	Banking
3	85	Axa	Paris	139.7	2.2	1,034.5	63.6	Insurance
4	104	Crédit Agricole	Paris	52.2	4.7	1,856.9	38.4	Banking
5	114	Sanofi	Paris	40.7	5.1	127.4	102.0	Pharmaceuticals
6	143	Dior	Paris	55.2	3.0	88.3	89.6	Apparel
7	157	Société Générale	Paris	49.5	4.0	1,496.9	24.5	Banking
8	159	Vinci	Rueil-Malmaison	52.1	3.5	86.1	55.8	Construction
9	186	Orange	Paris	48.8	2.3	112.3	43.6	Telecommunication
10	201	L'Oréal	Clichy	31.8	4.6	44.0	153.0	Consumer goods
11	204	Renault	Boulogne-Billancourt	67.7	3.9	131.5	20.9	Automotive
12	218	Peugeot	Rueil-Malmaison	87.3	3.3	70.8	24.9	Automotive
13	227	Engie	Courbevoie	71.5	1.2	175.7	36.2	Electric utility
14	244	Danone	Paris	29.1	2.8	50.5	51.2	Food processing
15	252	Schneider Electric	Rueil-Malmaison	30.3	2.8	48.3	47.6	Technology
16	268	Air Liquide	Paris	24.8	2.5	48.0	56.9	Chemicals
17	269	Électricité de France	Paris	81.4	0.7	323.7	43.4	Electric utility
18	285	CNP Assurances	Paris	47.6	1.6	450.4	16.5	Insurance
19	311	Safran	Paris	24.8	1.5	46.4	56.7	Aerospace and defense
20	324	Natixis	Paris	17.5	1.7	566.4	18.6	Banking
21	362	Kering	Paris	16.1	3.0	24.4	72.5	Apparel
22	382	Michelin	Clermont-Ferrand	26.0	2.0	33.7	23.8	Automotive parts
23	383	EssilorLuxottica	Charenton-le-Pont	12.7	1.3	52.9	52.9	Medical devices
24	424	Bouygues	Paris	41.9	1.5	43.1	14.6	Conglomerate
25	455	Pernod Ricard	Paris	10.7	1.7	35.2	45.9	Beverages
26	503	Thales Group	Paris	18.7	1.2	29.2	25.7	Aerospace and defense
27	523	Saint-Gobain	Courbevoie	49.3	0.5	50.3	22.5	Finance
28	662	Sodexo	Issy-les-Moulineaux	24.7	0.7	20.2	16.9	Foodservice
29	664	Carrefour	Massy	91.9	−0.7	54.2	14.7	Retail
30	666	Publicis	Paris	11.7	1.1	31.0	13.4	Advertising
31	670	Capgemini	Paris	15.6	0.9	18.9	20.9	Consulting
32	696	Veolia	Aubervilliers	30.6	0.4	43.0	13.1	Utilities
33	705	Vivendi	Paris	16.4	0.2	39.3	37.0	Media
34	716	Eiffage	Asnières-sur-Seine	19.9	0.7	34.7	9.6	Construction
35	775	Atos	Bezons	14.5	0.7	24.7	11.3	IT service
36	788	Hermès	Paris	7.0	1.7	8.5	71.5	Apparel
37	853	Valeo	Paris	22.6	0.6	21.1	8.6	Automotive parts
38	942	SCOR	Paris	16.9	0.4	48.3	8.1	Insurance
39	950	Air France-KLM	Paris	31.3	0.5	33.2	5.3	Airline
40	963	Alstom	Saint-Ouen-sur-Seine	9.8	1.0	15.9	10.2	Transportation
41	1005	Financière de l’Odet (Bolloré)	Paris	27.2	0.1	61.0	4.4	Media
42	1014	Legrand	Limoges	7.1	0.9	11.8	19.3	Electrical equipment
43	1020	Groupe ADP	Tremblay-en-France	5.3	0.7	18.4	20.0	Transportation
44	1041	Accor	Paris	4.3	2.6	14.8	12.0	Hotels
45	1072	Gecina	Paris	1.1	1.2	22.5	10.8	Real estate
46	1082	Dassault Aviation	Paris	6.0	0.7	19.5	12.1	Aerospace and defense
47	1091	Klépierre	Paris	1.4	0.8	29.2	10.7	Real estate
48	1171	Covivio	Metz	1.5	0.9	28.0	8.8	Real estate
49	1205	Arkema	Colombes	10.4	0.8	11.6	8.1	Chemicals
50	1208	Dassault Systèmes	Vélizy-Villacoublay	4.1	0.7	9.1	39.2	Technology
51	1517	SES	Betzdorf, Luxembourg	8.0	0.5	8.1	9.1	Telecommunications
52	1526	Finatis	Paris	44.2	−0.1		0.3	Retail
53	1719	Rexel	Paris	15.8	0.2	11.8	3.9	Retail
54	1724	Wendel	Paris	9.9	0.1	16.2	6.1	Finance
55	1733	Burelle	Paris	8.6	0.5	7.5	1.9	Automotive parts
56	1874	Bureau Veritas	Neuilly-sur-Seine	5.7	0.4	7.0	10.8	Certification
57	1897	Ipsen	Boulogne-Billancourt	2.6	0.5	3.9	11.0	Pharmaceuticals
