= Cegereal =

Cegereal, frequently styled CeGeREAL, is a real estate management company based in Paris, France. It is a member of the CAC Small 90.
