= Dr. CAC =

French television show

Dr. CAC was a French television show, broadcast on France 5 from 2011 to 2015.

Broadcast in daily (4 minutes) or weekly patterns (26 minutes), the show used the principle of archive images or diverse forgotten films to offer a simple and humorous lessons in economics.

Dr. Christian Cac is a fictional character, created by reusing images of the American actor Raymond Massey (1896-1983).

The name refers to the French stock exchange index, the CAC 40.
