= SBF 120 =

French stock market index

The SBF 120 (Société des Bourses Françaises 120 Index) is a French stock market index. The index is based on the 120 most actively traded stocks listed in Paris. It includes all 60 stocks in the CAC 40 and CAC Next 20 indexes and 60 additional stocks listed on the Premier Marché and Second Marché under Euronext Paris. The current, frequently changing, index composition is available on the Euronext Web site.

== See also ==
- List of French companies
