= VusionGroup =

Commerce technology company

Vusion

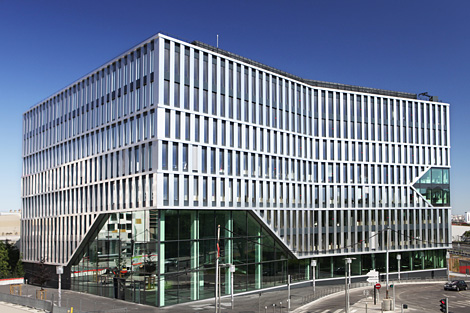
- Headquarters, Nanterre (France)
- Formerly: Store Electronic Systems (SES), SES-imagotag, Vusion Group
- Type: Subsidiary
- Traded as: CAC Mid 60 component
- Industry: Electronic shelf labels Computer vision Artificial intelligence Instore Retail Media Retail Intelligence Industrial IoT IoT Platform
- Founded: 1992
- Headquarters: Nanterre, France
- Key people: Thierry Gadou, Chairman & CEO
- Revenue: €1.5 billion (2025)
- Net income: −27.76 million euro
- Number of employees: 1200 (2026)
- Website: https://vusion.com

Vusion provides digitalization services for positive commerce, serving over 350 large retailer groups around the world in Europe, Asia and North America.

== History ==
Created under the name "Store Electronic Systems" (SES) in 1992, Vusion equipped its first store with electronic shelf labels (ESLs) in 1993.

Listed on the Paris stock exchange in 2006, the company expanded its international business with offices in Asia and Latin America in 2007.

In 2012, Thierry Gadou became chairman and CEO of the company. Connected electronic shelf labels (NFC) are installed during the same year.

In 2014, a strategic alliance is signed with imagotag GmbH (Austria) and Store Electronic Systems became SES-imagotag.

In 2015, SES-imagotag signs the largest ever contract of the electronic shelf labeling market.

In 2016, the Group signed an exclusive contract with Jysk Nordic, highlighting a rising interest from non-food retailers in the products and services provided by the Group. A trend confirmed by another deal signed with Sephora to equip the cosmetics retailer French stores.

In 2018, the company launched a digital and IoT platform operating on Microsoft's cloud, which aims to provide a better customer experience and store efficiency.

In 2024, SES-imagotag changed its name to VusionGroup. That same year, the company signed a contract with Walmart, increasing its revenue to 1 billion euros, and 1.5 billion euros in 2025.

On January 7, 2026, the company revealed its new name : Vusion. On July 27, Vusion announced the acquisition of In-Store Media (ISM).

== Economic information ==
Vusion has over 1200 employees. Vusion's sales reached 1,011 million euros in 2024 (an increase of 25% from 2023) and 1,507 million euros in 2025.

In 2018, Vusion and BOE Technology (a Chinese global semiconductor display group and supplier of IoT technologies) joined forces, the latter holding 79.94% of Vusion's share capital. BOE Technology has since gradually reduced its holding to 25% as of May 2025 and the free float has increased to roughly 47%. According to the companies investor relations FAQ page, the largest shareholders also include E Ink and Qualcomm.

In 2025, Vusion had sold 650 million Electronic Shelf Labels in 75,000 stores and has nearly 500 customers in more than 60 countries. Its main contracts are: Carrefour, Colruyt, Darty, Decathlon, Edeka, Fnac, Lidl, Jysk, Monoprix, Morrisson's, Spar, The Co-operative Group, and Walmart. The Walmart contract was extended in December 2023 to cover the entire Walmart US 4600 store fleet.

=== Offices Around the World ===
VusionGroup represented worldwide and has 20 offices in 14 countries.

- France: Nanterre (HQ), Cergy, Herblay, Amiens
- Australia: Sydney, Melbourne
- Austria: Fernitz-Mellach
- Canada: Montréal
- Croatia: Zagreb
- Germany: Ettenheim
- Italy: Milan
- Japan: Tokyo
- Mexico: Mexico City
- Netherlands: Amsterdam
- Spain: Madrid
- Taiwan: Tainan City
- United Kingdom: London, Cork
- United States: Chicago, Dallas

=== Partnerships ===
- In 2019 with Cisco to develop WiFi embedded IoT infrastructure for physical commerce.
- In 2024 with Strongpoint to integrate in store picking software.
- in 2024 with Exeger to develop indoor lighting powered shelf labels.
- In 2025 with NielsenIQ to integrate point of sales data, shelf insights and consumer data.
- Has Resellers network of 156 companies presenting company worldwide

== See also ==
- Electronic shelf label
