= Kaufman & Broad S.A. =

French real estate company

Kaufman & Broad SA
- Type: Société anonyme
- Traded as: Euronext Paris: KOF; CAC Small; SIREN code: 702 022 724
- ISIN: FR0004007813
- Industry: Real estate development Construction
- Founded: 1968
- Headquarters: Neuilly-sur-Seine, France (officially registered as Courbevoie, France)
- Key people: Guy Nafilyan (Chairman and CEO)
- Revenue: €1.04 billion (2011)
- Operating income: €89.85 million (2011)
- Net income: €57.49 million (2011)
- Total assets: €537.82 million (2011)

Kaufman & Broad is a publicly traded real estate development and construction company headquartered in Neuilly-sur-Seine, France. It was a subsidiary of the American homebuilding company KB Home until May 2007, when it was sold to the private equity firm PAI Partners for 601 million euros (812 million dollars). It is Paris's largest homebuilder.

== History ==
The company was created in 1968 and delivered its first homes in 1970. After a series of acquisitions Kaufman & Broad S.A. was listed on the Paris Bourse in 2000. Kaufman & Broad sold homes in 1968; they had a development called Peppertree in Northridge, CA, that year.

== Activities ==
Kaufman & Broad is a developer and constructor in a number of real estate sectors, including single-family homes, apartments, accommodations and office spaces. It operates through its many subsidiaries.

== Direction ==
The current president of Kaufman & Broad S.A. is Guy Nafilyan.

== Shareholders' structure ==
This is the shareholders' structure reported by the company as of 30 November 2011:

Shareholder	Number of shares	Percentage
Financière Gaillon 8 and companies held by the funds from PAI Partners	19,133,746	88.65%
Kaufman & Broad	278,109	1.29%
Public	1,983,806	9.19%
Employees	188,997	0.88%
