= Grand'Place =

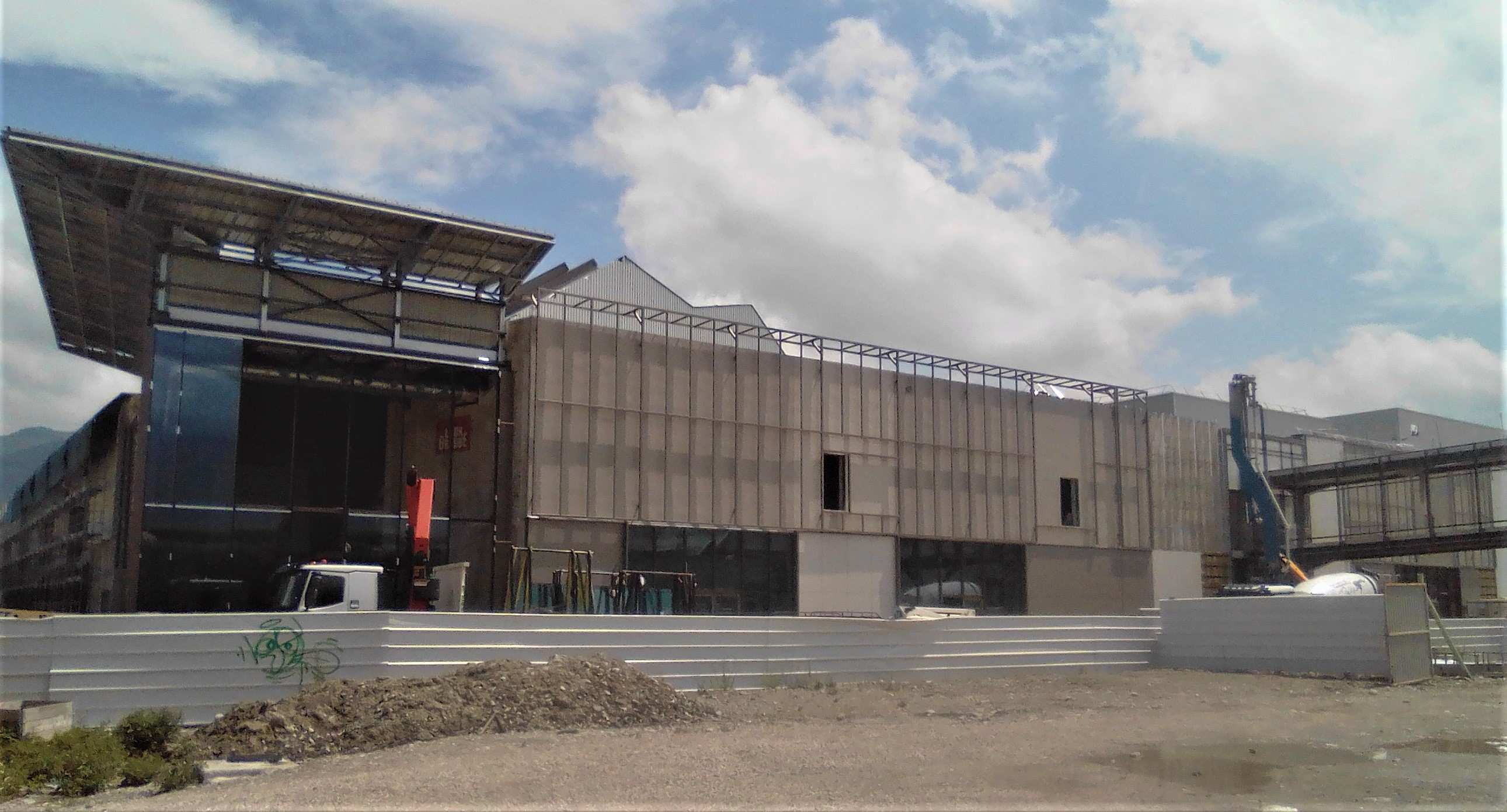
- Location: Grenoble and Échirolles, France
- Coordinates: 45°09′29″N 5°43′57″E
- Opened: August 26, 1975
- Website: grand-place.klepierre.fr

Grand'Place is a shopping center in the city of Grenoble, France.

== History ==
It was built in 1975, It comprises Grand'Place and the Carrefour hypermarket.

It has been managed by Corio since 2000. It was refurbished in 2001.
