= Mercialys =

Mercialys SA
- Company type: Société anonyme
- Traded as: Euronext: MERY; CAC Mid 60 Component
- Industry: Real estate investment Real estate management
- Founded: 2005
- Headquarters: Paris, France
- Area served: France
- Key people: Éric Le Gentil (Chairman and CEO); Sarah Leroy (General secretary)
- Operating income: ▼€91.6 million (2016)
- Net income: ▼€114.19 million (2016)
- Total assets: ▼€2.41 billion (2016)
- Total equity: ▲€737.9 million (2016)
- Number of employees: 122
- Website: Mercialys.fr

Mercialys is a French company that operates in real estate, owning and managing properties. It was created by the retailer company, Casino Group in 2005.

== History ==
In the late 1990s, the food retailer company Casino Group delegated the management of their retailer properties in a new subsidiary, Groupe Casino Immobilière. In 2005, it was turned into a company with independent operations, which would go public itself, called Mercialys, although Groupe Casino retained a majority stake and therefore its control. Mercialys was listed on the Paris Bourse on November 1, 2005. The new company opted for the SIIC legal tax status for real estate investment trusts.

== Activities ==
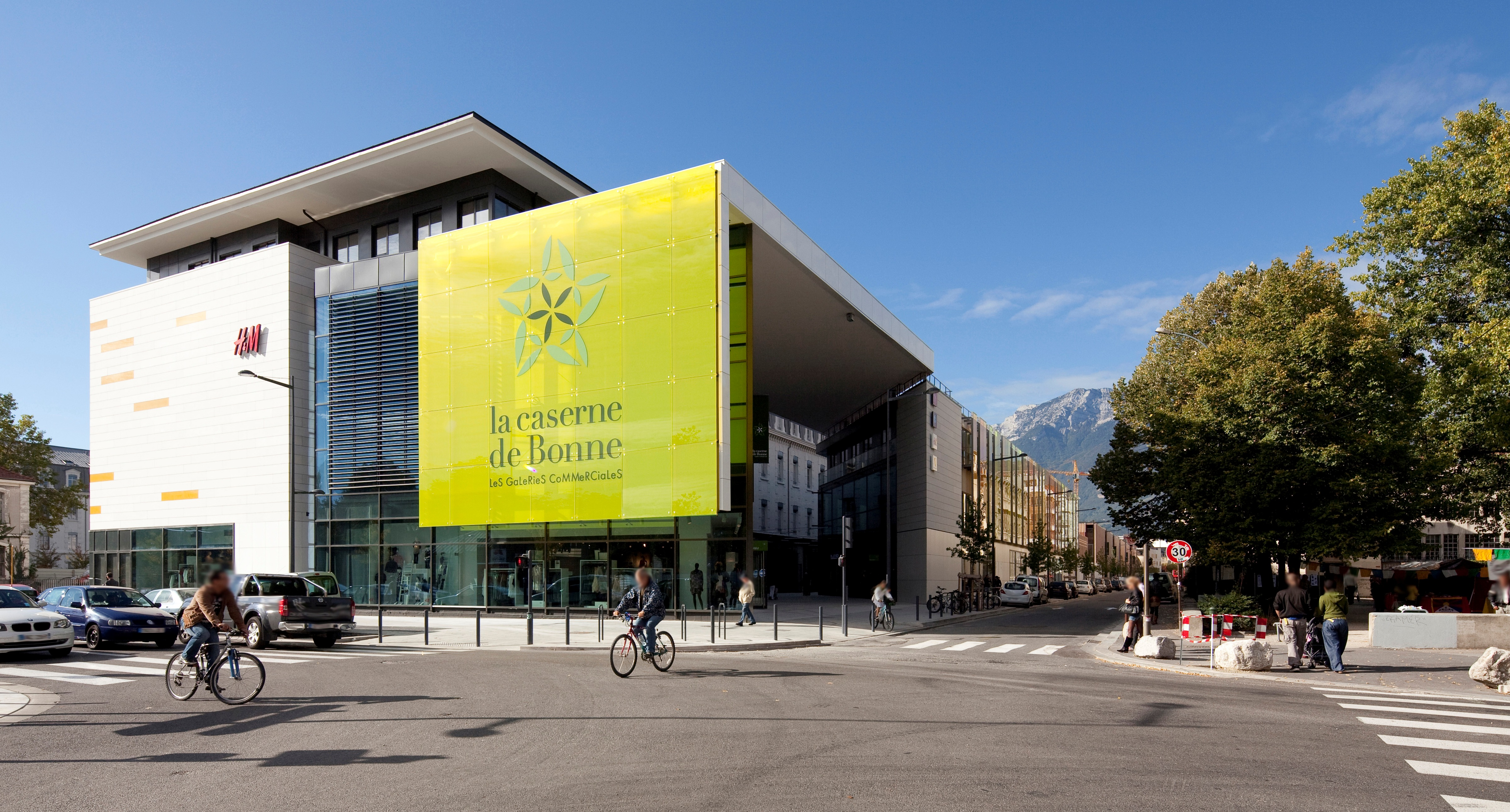
La Caserne de Bonne, one of the shopping malls leased by Mercialys.

Mercialys leases its properties (mostly shopping malls, self-service restaurants and other vendor locations) to retailer companies so that these exploit it. The fact Mercialys maintains retail property assets in the long run, renovating and renting them, with limited exposure to development activities, gives it an advantage and a lower risk for investors. It manages more than 120 properties, with a gross leasable area of about 714,500 m^{2}. The Mercialys' subsidiaries include Mercialys Gestion, Timur SCI, Point Confort and La Diane, among others.

On March 4, 2012, Mercialys issued a bond to seven years, raising 650 million. Also, it took debt from five banks to finance a 1.25 billion euros exceptional distribution for shareholders. It was supposed that these operations were carried out to fund Casino Group projects in Brazil.

== Ownership ==
As of January 31 of 2020, the company reported the following composition in the ownership of shares:

- 61.28% Public
- 25.16% Casino Group
- 8.01% Generali Group
- 5.00% Crédit Agricole corporate and Investment Bank
- 0.38% Treasury shares
- 0.18% Foncière Euris

On February 9, 2012, Casino confirmed its intention of reducing participation in Mercialys to 30 or 40 percent with the aim of obtain by 800 million euros. On 4 May 2012, it announced the selling of a 9.8 percent to Crédit Agricole Corporate and Investment Bank, a subsidiary of Crédit Agricole, receiving 138 million euros and thus reducing its stake to 40.2 percent.
