= Universal Display Corporation =

Developer and manufacturer of OLED technologies

- Type: Public
- Traded as: Nasdaq: OLED; S&P 400 component; Russell 1000 component
- Industry: Display, Lighting, Technology, Computer Hardware
- Founded: 1994; 32 years ago
- Headquarters: Ewing, New Jersey, U.S.
- Key people: Sid Rosenblatt (CFO); Steven V. Abramson (CEO)
- Products: Organic Light Emitting Diodes
- Website: oled.com

Universal Display Corporation is a developer and manufacturer of organic light emitting diode (OLED) technologies and materials, and it is a provider of services to the display and lighting industries.

Founded in 1994, the company currently owns or has license rights to more than 6,500 issued and pending patents worldwide for the commercialization of phosphorescent based OLEDs and also flexible, transparent and stacked OLEDs - for both display and lighting applications. Its phosphorescent OLED technologies and materials are licensed and supplied to companies such as Samsung, LG, AU Optronics CMEL, Pioneer, Panasonic Idemitsu OLED lighting and Konica Minolta.

UDC is working with many other companies, including Sony, DuPont and Novaled. In 2009, UDC claimed that "virtually all AMOLEDs on the market use our technology". Based in Ewing, New Jersey, with international offices in Ireland, South Korea, Hong Kong, Japan and Taiwan, Universal Display works with a network of organizations, including Princeton University, the University of Southern California, the University of Michigan, and PPG Industries.

UDC has been subject to a number of patent disputes. The patents however have been upheld as valid. In November 2025, it was announced UDC had acquired emissive OLED patent assets from the Darmstadt-headquartered science and technology company, Merck KGaA for an undisclosed amount.

== Products that use UDC technology ==
Apple began using OLED panels in its watches in 2015 and in its laptops in 2016 with the introduction of an OLED touchbar to the MacBook Pro. In 2017, Apple announced the introduction of their tenth anniversary iPhone X with their own optimized OLED display licensed from Universal Display Corporation. All subsequent iPhones have had OLED displays. Apple has also expanded the use of OLED displays into iPads and also future MacBooks

The Korea Times claimed that Google's wearable display headset Google Glass would use OLED microdisplays made by Samsung Display, with licensed technology from Universal Display.

Sony have announced the 3rd generation of their Heads Up Micro-Displays (HMD) using OLED panels from UDC.

=== Smartphones ===
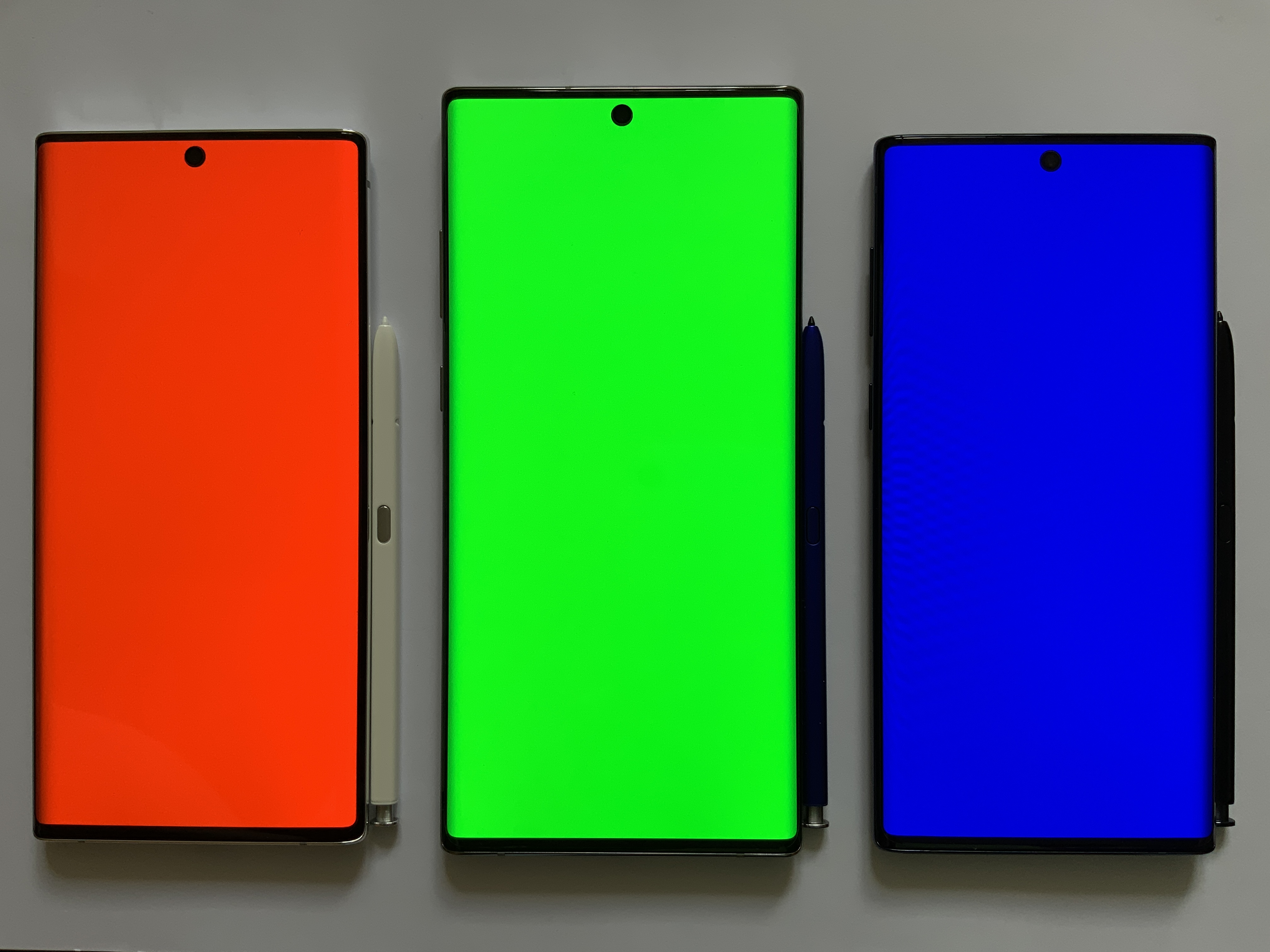
The Samsung Galaxy smartphones, with Dynamic AMOLED screens

Universal Display's OLED screens are in Samsung's Galaxy S, S II and S III, Galaxy S IV, and Galaxy S5 smartphones. The Galaxy S4 has a 4.99" Full-HD (1920x1080, 441 PPI) Super AMOLED display behind a Corning Gorilla Glass 3.

Universal Display reported that Samsung Display Corporation (SDC) adopted UDC's green PHOLED (host and emitter) in the 5" Full-HD Super AMOLED display used in the Galaxy S4 smartphone. This is a significant development as the green PHOLED increases energy efficiency of displays by up to 25%

Nokia's Lumia 1020 smartphone and BlackBerry's Q10 and Z30 models have OLED screens.

In October 2013, Samsung released the first ever curved display smartphone called the Galaxy Round. Samsung also introduced the "Roll Effect" where when the phone's screen is off and is rolled, it displays basic information like time or battery percentage. While it is possible to curve LCD screens, analysts say OLED screens provide better technical benefits. Samsung introduced the Galaxy Round in the Korean market in October 2013. The device features a 1080p screen, measuring 5.7 inches (14 cm), that curves on the vertical axis in a rounded case. The Galaxy S5, launched in Feb 2014, has a 5-inch Super AMOLED screen.

=== Smart watches ===
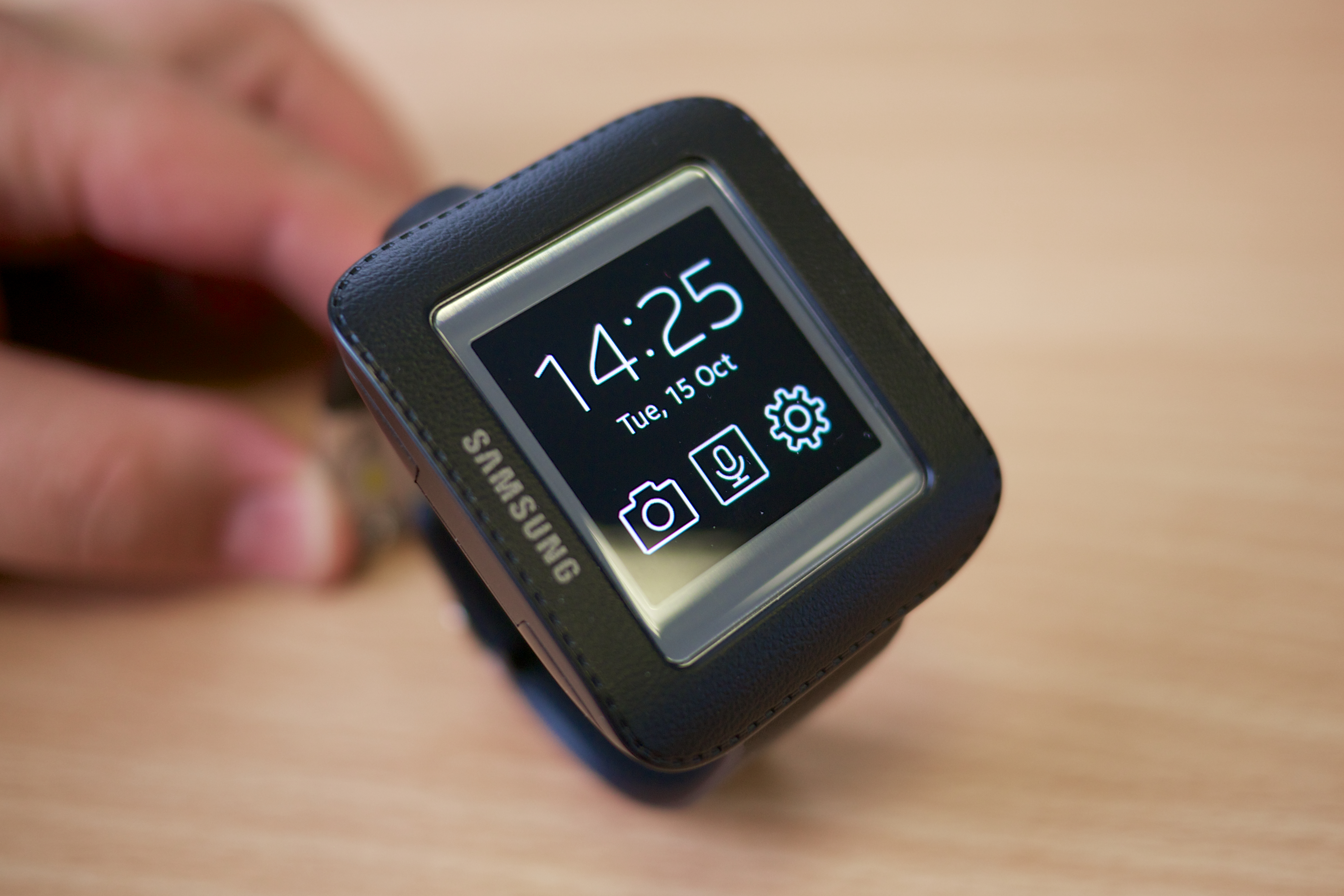
A Galaxy Gear in its USB charging cradle, displaying a digital clock

In September 2013 Samsung unveiled their Galaxy Gear Smartwatch having a 1.6 inch OLED screen and multiple apps to link the watch to an Android smartphone. It originally went on sale in the US in October 2013 for $299 and featured a 1.63" 320x320 (275 PPI) Super AMOLED display. The LG G Watch R is smartwatch featuring a circular face and an OLED screen. LG has released a second premium smart watch called the "Urbane" which retails for $590. OLED displays are expected to dominate the smart watch market with 58% market share. Apple began using OLED panels in its watches in 2015 and all subsequent watches.

=== Tablets ===
Panasonic has showcased a 20-inch OLED screened tablet with a resolution of 4K (3840×2160 pixels). Samsung has released two Galaxy Tablets using OLED technology. The Galaxy Tab S 10.5 was released with Android 4.4.2 Kitkat. The Galaxy Tab S 10.5 has a 10.5-inch WQXGA Super AMOLED screen with a resolution of 2560x1600 pixels and a pixel density of 287 ppi. The Galaxy Tab S 8.4 has an 8.4-inch Full HD Super AMOLED screen with a resolution of 2560x1600 pixels and a pixel density of 359 ppi.

=== Televisions ===
Samsung and LG-Display showed 55-inch OLED-Television devices at CES-2012. But both companies had to delay their mass production. Also AUO, Sony and Epson will start AMOLED-TV production in 2014.

In June 2013 Samsung announced the Korean availability of a 55-inch curved OLED HDTV. Priced at 15 million Korean won (around $13,500). Samsung also reiterates the claim LG made when it launched its own curved OLED model that "keeping all parts of the screen an equal distance from the viewer makes for a better viewing experience." By August 2013, Samsung dropped the price of the OLED television by 30% claiming "better yields" in manufacturing. In September 2013 at the IFA electronics show, Samsung unveiled their 98-inch 4K AMOLED television.

LG showcased an Ultra High Definition (UHD) curved 77inch screen at the IFA electronics show. This is a 4K WRGB OLED screen. In October 2014, LG reported that their Television sales has jumped 20x in volume shipments since 2013. CNET reviewed the LG 55EC9300 OLED Television in September 2014 and called it "The best. Picture. Ever." Combining the best qualities of LED and Plasma without the disadvantages.

With the arrival of Quantum Dot LCD displays, LG released an article describing why they still see OLED as the future of Television displays: "In fact, OLED technology is the technology that is so much advanced that it should not be compared to an LCD based QD. Hence, even though LG already has the technology to create QD backlighting, it is focusing on developing OLED".

In January 2015, LG Display signed a long-term agreement with UDC for the supply of OLED materials and the right to use their patented OLED emitters. LG is the leader in the push for OLED Televisions. In 2017, LG revealed five new models of OLED TVs, the flagship model being as thin as 0.9mm.

== Technological advantages of OLED ==
The different manufacturing process of OLEDs lends itself to several advantages over flat panel displays made with current LCD technology.

Lower cost in the future
OLEDs can be printed onto any suitable substrate by an inkjet printer or even by screen printing, theoretically making them cheaper to produce than LCD or plasma displays. However, fabrication of the OLED substrate is more costly than that of a TFT LCD, until mass production methods lower cost through scalability. Roll-to-roll vapour-deposition methods for organic devices do allow mass production of thousands of devices per minute for minimal cost, although this technique also induces problems in that devices with multiple layers can be challenging to make because of registration, lining up the different printed layers to the required degree of accuracy.
Lightweight and flexible plastic substrates
OLED displays can be fabricated on flexible plastic substrates leading to the possible fabrication of flexible organic light-emitting diodes for other new applications, such as roll-up displays embedded in fabrics or clothing. As the substrate used can be flexible such as polyethylene terephthalate (PET), the displays may be produced inexpensively.
Wider viewing angles and improved brightness
OLEDs can enable a greater artificial contrast ratio (both dynamic range and static, measured in purely dark conditions) and a wider viewing angle compared to LCDs because OLED pixels emit light directly. OLED pixel colors appear correct and unshifted, even as the viewing angle approaches 90° from normal.
Better power efficiency and thickness
LCDs filter the light emitted from a backlight, allowing a small fraction of light through. So, they cannot show true black. However, an inactive OLED element does not produce light or consume power, thus allowing true blacks. Dismissing the backlight also makes OLEDs lighter because some substrates are not needed. This allows electronics potentially to be manufactured more cheaply, but, first, a larger production scale is needed, because OLEDs still somewhat are niche products. When looking at top-emitting OLEDs, thickness also plays a role when talking about index match layers (IMLs). Emission intensity is enhanced when the IML thickness is 1.3–2.5 nm. The refractive value and the matching of the optical IMLs property, including the device structure parameters, also enhance the emission intensity at these thicknesses.
Response time
OLEDs also can have a faster response time than standard LCD screens. Whereas LCD displays are capable of between 1 and 16 ms response time offering a refresh rate of 60 to 480 Hz, an OLED theoretically can have a response time less than 0.01 ms, enabling a refresh rate up to 100,000 Hz . OLEDs also can be run as a flicker display, similar to a CRT, in order to eliminate the sample-and-hold effect that creates motion blur on OLEDs.

Some disadvantages include:

Power consumption
While an OLED will consume around 40% of the power of an LCD displaying an image that is primarily black, for the majority of images it will consume 60–80% of the power of an LCD. However, an OLED can use more than three times as much power to display an image with a white background, such as a document or web site. This can lead to reduced battery life in mobile devices, when white backgrounds are used.

According to OLED Display "Samsung Display uses different Sub Pixel Matrix technologies for their smartphone Super-Amoled Displays. For the Galaxy S4 and S5 they use the Diamond Pixel Matrix."

== Flexible displays ==
OLEDs enable screens to be made in curved or flexible format. Samsung's flexible AMOLEDs will be fabricated on a plastic (Polyimide) substrate and will be able to withstand high temperature (up to 350-400 degrees). The displays can be bendable - but since the first products will use them inside rigid glass cases - so it'll actually be "curved" displays and not flexible ones. A plastic based AMOLED will be shatterproof, and will also be lighter and thinner compared to glass based OLEDs.

OLED Info reports that for flexible displays on plastic, UDC's UniversalBarrier single-layer encapsulation technology is being evaluated by Samsung. UDC has a working 6" R&D deposition machine for the encapsulation layer. They go on to describe how Corning Glass have developed a flexible glass to help speed up the adoption of bendable OLED screens. "On Aug. 28 2013, Corning and AU Optronics announced that Corning is an important and strategic high-performance display glass collaborator for AUO’s line of AMOLED panels. AUO selected the Corning Lotus Glass platform based on the glass substrate’s outstanding thermal and dimensional stability. This aids AUO with efficient manufacturing during the high-temperature processes that are required to develop its AMOLED panels." Corning is also developing a Roll to Roll manufacturing process that will greatly reduce costs of mass-producing flexible displays.

UBI Research published a new report on flexible OLED displays, forecasting a very fast growth: from 20 million units in 2012 to 150 million units in 2013. UBI sees $6.3 billion in flexible OLED revenues in 2017. This is far more optimistic than the recent report by Markets&Markets who see the entire flexible display market at $3.2 billion in 2017.

The Flexible Display Center announced that it has successfully manufactured the world's largest flexible color AMOLED prototype using advanced mixed oxide thin film transistors (TFTs). Measuring 7.4 diagonal inches, the device was developed at the FDC in conjunction with Army Research Labs scientists. It also meets a critical target set by the U.S. Department of Defense to advance the development of full-color, full-motion video flexible OLED displays for use in thin, lightweight, bendable and highly rugged devices. "This is a significant manufacturing breakthrough for flexible display technology," said Nick Colaneri, director of the FDC. "It provides a realistic path forward for the production of high-performance, flexible, full color OLED displays, accelerating commercialization of the technology in the process."

Universal Display's Sid Rosenblatt talking about the future of OLED technology was quoted as saying: "Samsung is going to introduce flexible screens, but the flexible plastic substrates are difficult to manufacture. Plastic is porous and oxygen with moisture causes OLEDs to degrade. [However]...These kind of displays are unbreakable, flexible on stainless steel foil. It would result in a thinner device because you don’t have the pieces of glass. It could conform around the sides, so you can show information on the sides. It would be lighter. So you can either make it smaller or thinner or you can make a larger battery so that it lasts longer. The challenges are encapsulation, so you need an encapsulation process. The temperature is too high to deposit them directly to the plastic, so they do is they literally deposit them on glass." Further, Sid Rosenblatt thinks that flexible OLEDs will be initially a niche market for the high end.

iSuppli, a market research firm, sees the flexible OLED display market growing significantly from 2013 to 2020. Their estimates are from a market value of $21 million in 2013 to $100 million in 2014 and reaching $12 billion by 2020. IHS says this will bring about "unprecedented change(s) in flat displays". Both LG and Samsung believe that flexible displays will make up as much as 40% of the Smartphone maker by 2018.

At the Flextech Conference in Phoenix, Arizona, Plastic Logic and Novaled demonstrated a new, really bendable, and completely organic AMOLED display. OLED News said: "This is a very important technological advance. For the first time we have an entirely plastic AMOLED with backplane electronics manufactured in a special low temperature process. The industrial techniques applied open up real prospects of mass producing these displays at a very competitive unit cost." Plastic Logic CEO, Indro Mukerjee, spoke of 2014 as the year when wearable technology is going to really take off. He described the advance that has been made in the following: "Flexible electronics is a reality, already proven through the development and manufacture of plastic, bendable displays and sensors. For the first time a fully organic, plastic, flexible AMOLED demonstration has been achieved with a real industrial fabrication process. This marks the start of a revolution in wearable products, the next frontier in consumer."

== OLEDs in lighting ==
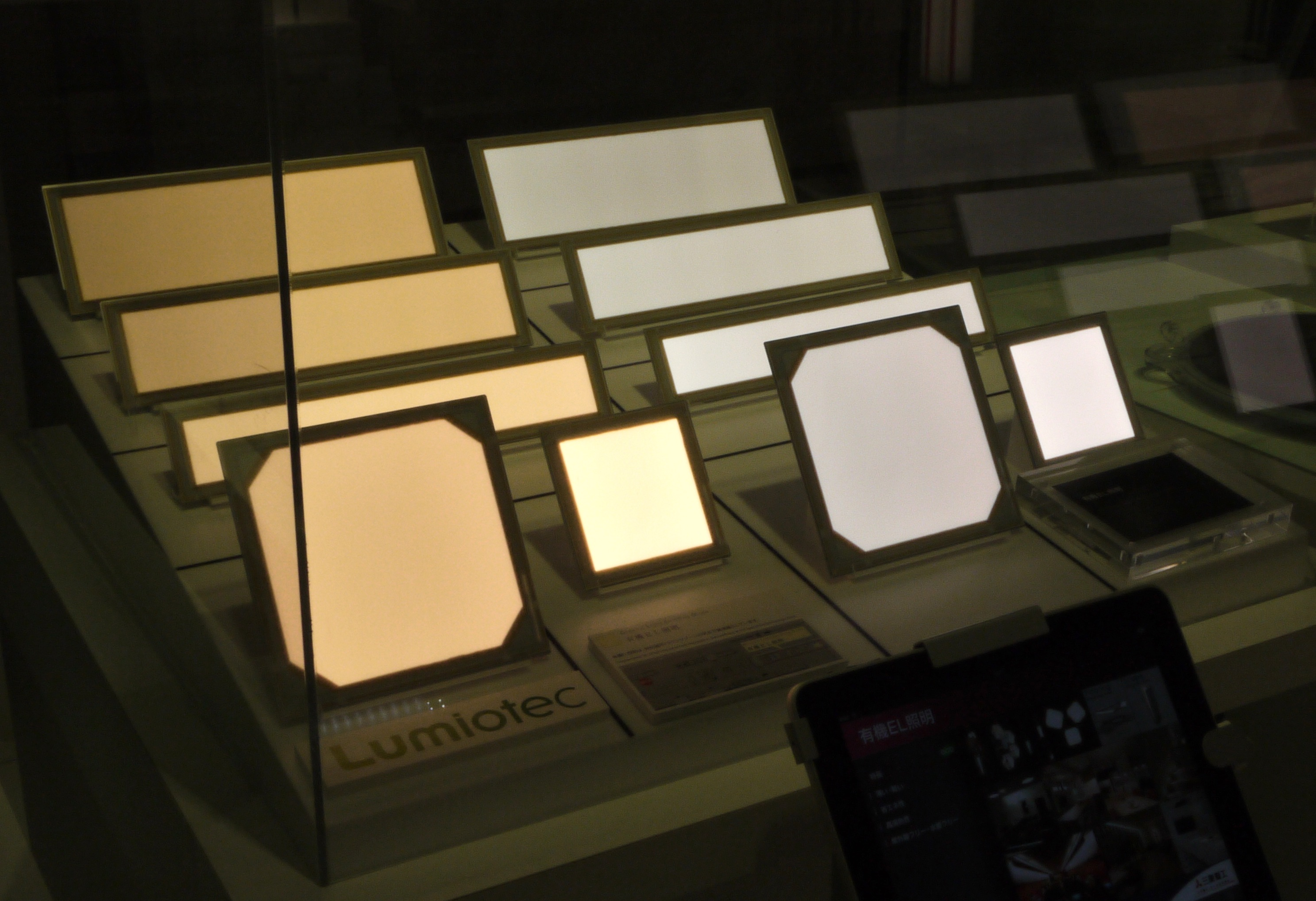
Prototype OLED lighting panel developed by Lumiotec

OLEDs provide low temperature, low energy use lighting panels. OSRAM believes that the next technological development for car lighting is OLEDs. The major advantage is that they provide "completely new options for the design of light and luminaires". The cars of the future, according to Osram will have both LED and OLED lighting sources. In 2011, OSRAM built an OLED lighting production line in Regensburg, Germany. The company invested 50 million euros (around $70 million) in the production facility and in research on OLED applications.

The German government launched a new €34 million (about $44 million) project called OLYMP ("Organic Light-emitting sYstems based on energy and cost-efficient Materials and Processes") that intends to improve "OLED lighting efficiency and lifetime".

Philips has said in 2014 OLEDs will be ready to enter the lighting market in a more significant way. Dietmar Thomas, Philips' OLED communication and brand manager says: "Philips' OLED performance increased dramatically in the past 2-3 years. Their most advanced panel (the GL350 Gen-2) offers 200 lumens and 45 lm/W. In mid 2014, Philips expects to release a panel (the GL350 Gen-3?) that will be brighter (300 lumens) and more efficient (60 lm/W). "

According to OLED-Display.net "OLED technology has been found useful in creating new forms of lighting. Because of the potential inherent with OLED technology in terms of its flexibility, transparency and thickness, a myriad of new possibilities exist for OLED illumination, lighting and light display shows. The potential is almost infinite, because OLED technology has proven to show lifetimes over 50,000 hours and because it burns at rates that surpass the efficiency of halogen and can reach up to 150 lm/W. In addition, OLED lighting utilizes less CO2, requires less energy and contains no toxic substances. This opens up a revolutionary concept of lighting displays and light based art conceptions."

== Patent disputes ==
In 2012, UDC reported two favorable patent decisions. The first one is from Japan, regarding two patents (JP781 and JP158) relating to UDC's L2MX technology. The patents were upheld as valid by the Japanese patent office. The second decision related to one of the OVJP patents in Korea. The Korean patent office issued a favorable decision which upheld the patent as valid. Some financial analysts have contended that Universal Display's patents are likely to be rescinded in November 2013 at the EPO Board of Appeal. However, Oppenheimer analyst Andrew Uekwitz already chimed in to defend them, saying Asensio's latest article "contains nothing new or valuable" that wasn't already disclosed in its most recent quarterly report.
