= Contres =

Contres may refer to the following places in France:

- Contres, Cher, a commune in the department of Cher
- Contres, Loir-et-Cher, a commune in the department of Loir-et-Cher
