= Neyco =

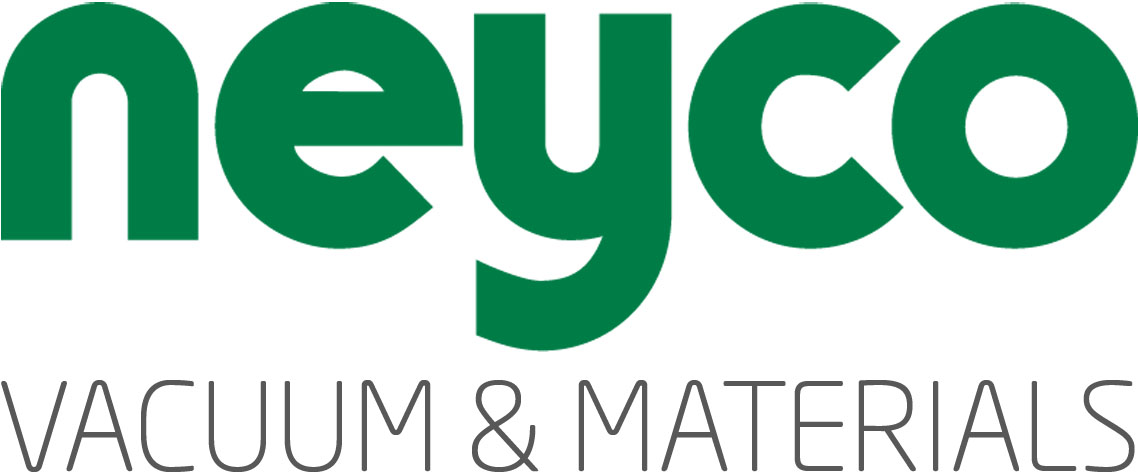
- Type: S.A. (corporation)
- Industry: Vacuum, Material and Thin Film
- Founded: 1954
- Headquarters: Vanves, France
- Number of employees: 20 employees
- Website: www.neyco.fr

Neyco is a French company founded in 1954, specialist in High Vacuum, UHV, Inorganic materials and thin films.

In 2022, the company was acquired by HEF Group, an international surface engineering company with plans to extend its activities to the field of photonics through acquisitions (which includes other french companies such as Fichou, Kerdry, Acerde and American companies, notably Abrisa technologies and The Telic Company).

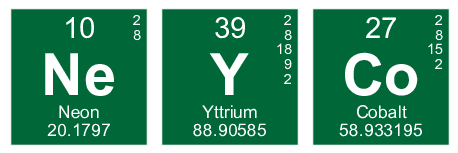

== History ==
Initially created to allow access to International semiconductors, Neyco developed its area of expertise in Vacuum, Materials and Thin films: - Vacuum and UHV with mechanics (chambers, components, gauges, pumps ...) - Inorganic materials from Aluminum to Zirconium in all shapes (powders to targets) and all forms (metals, oxides, alloys, borides, nitrides, sulfides ...). - Thin films (i.e. layers below one micron) deposited under vacuum by thermal evaporation, electron beam, sputtering and/or laser ablation.

In 2017, Neyco Group also includes the activity of Kerdry, the biggest French operation and clean room only dedicated to thin films on request (evaporation, E-beam, sputtering) based in Lannion (France) known for optical deposition, metallic deposition and photolithography.

Located in Vanves, 3km South of Paris, with production facilities in France and Great Britain, NEYCO is a European leading company in the fields of vacuum, thin film deposition and coating materials for PVD.

Neyco is also a member of the Society of Vacuum Coaters (USA) and of the European Material Research Society (EMRS).

Following its growth, Olivier Costa became the new general manager of Neyco in October 2018. Isabelle Richardt (CEO) has also been elected secretary of SFV (French Vacuum Society).

In July 2022, the French Group HEF acquired Neyco to extend its activities related to photonics. Since then, Neyco has kept their company name and added a mention to HEF in its logo, a common practice within the group. In HEF, some acquisitions keep their name as Neyco did, while others take on the HEF name fully (example: Abrisa technologies, from the USA) .

Neyco's logo after HEF acquisition

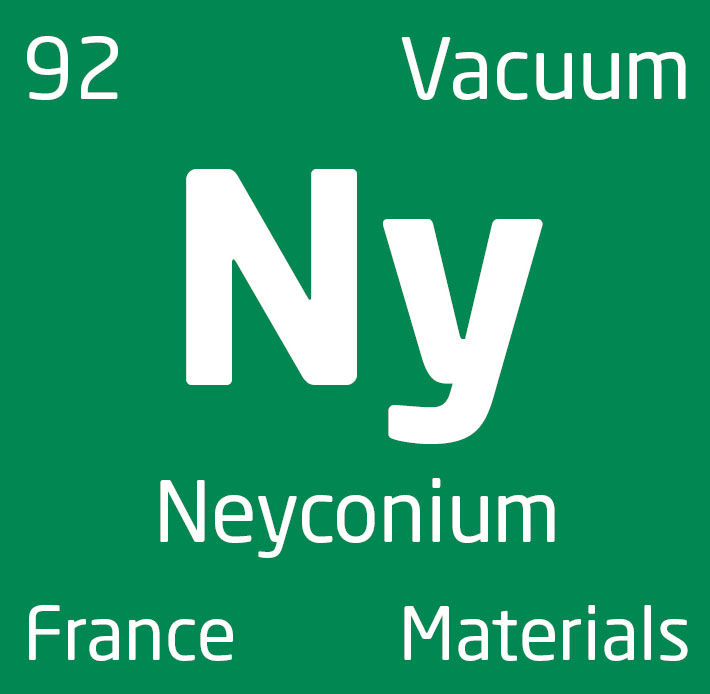
image:200 pixels

== Product Focus ==
Neyco's activities largely revolve around the sale and manufacturing of the following products:

- Inorganic materials;
- Thin films;
- Vacuum;
- Silicon wafers;
- Bellows;
- Optical deposition;
- Gauges;
- Technical Lubs;
- Silicones;
- Metallic powder.

== Patents and awards ==
- Durand, Jean; Lauvray, Francois; Richardt, Isabelle (14 February 2008). "Methods for Coating a Substrate and Forming a Colored Film and Related Device".
- In June 2014, Neyco received the innovation award presented by the Société Française du Vide for the project TACE (Target for Anti Charge Effect).
- In June 2015, Neyco received the Award for Best Project Success at the ACC Silicones Distributor Seminar.
- KERDRY-Neyco is ISO9001 and have the CIR 2017 - 2018 -2019 agreement.

== Publications linked to Neyco ==
- Allemand, Alexandre; GUILLERMIN, Edouard; Petitcorps, Yann Le (4 June 2019). "Method for preparing a carbide ceramics multilayer coating on, and optionally in, a part made of a carbon-containing material using a reactive melt infiltration RMI technique".
- Bernard-Granger, Guillaume; Favier, Katia; Soulier, Mathieu; Navone, Christelle; Boidot, Mathieu; Deniau, Benoit; Grondin, Pauline; Leforestier, Jean; Simon, Julia (December 2014). "Thermoelectric properties of an N-type silicon–germanium alloy related to the presence of silica nodules dispersed in the microstructure". Scripta Materialia. 93: 40–43. doi:10.1016/j.scriptamat.2014.08.026.
- Aassime, A.; Hamouda, F.; Richardt, I.; Bayle, F.; Pillard, V.; Lecoeur, P.; Aubert, P.; Bouchier, D. (October 2013). "Anti-charging process for electron beam observation and lithography". Microelectronic Engineering. 110: 320–323. doi:10.1016/j.mee.2013.02.036.
- Dejeu, Jérôme; Abadie, Joël; Piat, Emmanuel; Rougeot, Patrick; Oster, Stéphane; Stempflé, Philippe; Takadoum, Jamal (June 2010). "Development of a new nanotribometer with multi asperity contact". 14th Nordic Symposium on Tribology, Nordtrib'10: 1–9.
- Vincent, Brice; Boudrioua, Azzedine; Kremer, Régis; Moretti, Paul (March 2005). "Second harmonic generation in helium-implanted periodically poled lithium niobate planar waveguides". Optics Communications. 247 (4–6): 461–469. Bibcode:2005OptCo.247..461V. doi:10.1016/j.optcom.2004.11.079.
