= HiPay =

HiPay Group SA
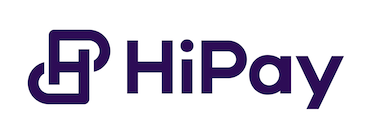
- Company type: Public Company
- Traded as: ALHYP
- Industry: Payment Service Provider (PSP)
- Founded: 16 March 2015
- Headquarters: France
- Key people: Benjamin JAYET, Chairman Pierre GIRONCE, CEO
- Products: HiPay offers tailor-made payment solutions for pure players, omnichannel brands, marketplaces and franchises. HiPay Console centralizes payments from different sales channels into a single dashboard. HiPay Sentinel uses AI and machine learning to optimize fraud management, balancing security and conversion.
- Operating income: ▲€74,2 million (2024)
- Net income: ▲€5,8 million (2024)
- Total equity: €30,2 million (2024)
- Number of employees: 220
- Website: https://hipay.com

HiPay is a European Payment Service Provider (PSP) listed on the Paris stock exchange and approved as a payment institution by the French supervisory authority.

HiPay offers tailor-made payment solutions for pure players, omnichannel brands, marketplaces and franchises, whatever the size of their store network.

== History ==
HiPay Group SA is formerly a subsidiary of HiMedia Group.

2011: Payment Institution accreditation granted by the ACPR.

2014: Launch of Sentinel, a customized anti-fraud tool designed to optimize conversion securely.

2015:The company became independent. It was listed on Euronext Paris (Compartment C) after receiving approval from France's financial markets regulator, the AMF. In its first year as a listed company, HiPay reported a 12% increase in revenue, despite posting a net loss of €2.8 million.

2016: Launch of an offer aimed at marketplaces. The company expanded into the Italian market. That same year, investor Benjamin Jayet, through his holding company BJ Invest, acquired a 29.83% stake in HiPay, becoming its majority shareholder and assuming the role of chairman. Grégoire Bourdin was appointed CEO. Annual revenue reached €30.7 million.

2017: HiPay sold its operator billing business to Gibmedia, refocusing as a pure digital payment provider. It also launched a fraud prevention tool powered by artificial intelligence.

2018: The company introduced an omnichannel payment solution covering both online and in-store transactions.

2021: Launch of HiPay Console, the new interface for centralizing payments management.

2022: Launch of an omnichannel offer, enabling merchants to unify the management of their business, across all sales channels.

2023 & 2024: First profitable years.
