= Manuloc =

- Type: Private
- Founded: 1964
- Headquarters: Metz, France and Poland
- Key people: Catherine Barthelemy, founder
- Products: Forklift truck
- Revenue: ▲ Euro €300 million
- Number of employees: 1 200 worldwide
- Website: www.manuloc.lu

Manuloc is a French company founded in 1964, which provides industrial services for forklift trucks. It specializes in distribution activity, counseling expertise, park maintenance equipment, and industrial vehicles and logistics.

Aside from France, Manuloc is also present in nine other markets: Belgium, Luxembourg, Poland, Romania, Russia, Slovakia, Turkey, Czech Republic, Switzerland. In 2010, Manuloc had approximately 1,200 employees, including its subsidiaries.

== Sources ==
- Figaro article
- Les Échos article
- Vidéo of Catherine Barthélémy during The Entrepreneurship Week
- Stratégies Logistique article
- "la Tribune" MANULOC EASTERN EUROPA article
