= Viseo =

- Type: Private
- Industry: IT consulting
- Founded: 1999; 27 years ago
- Founders: Olivier Dhonte; Eric Perrier
- Headquarters: Boulogne-Billancourt, France
- Area served: France
- Website: viseo.com

Viseo (stylized in all caps) is a French information technology consulting company headquartered in Boulogne-Billancourt, France.

== History ==
Viseo was founded in 1999 by Olivier Dhonte and Eric Perrier with a focus on SAP implementation projects for L'Oréal.

Viseo continued to expand internationally through acquisitions. In 2017, it acquired NAIT Consulting in Singapore. In 2018, it acquired and integrated Birchman Spain and DTM, renaming them as Viseo Iberia. Viseo acquired Cludo in Sydney in 2020.

In 2021, Viseo secured a €120 million loan from BlackRock. A year later, in 2022, Viseo acquired Scanomi, a Singapore-based Anaplan partner.

In 2023, Viseo acquired the French consulting firm Synvance and Carnac Group, an Australia-based Salesforce partner. Two years later, Viseo expanded its ERP cloud system and finance transformation operations by investing in E-Outsource Asia and acquiring Upskills, a technology consultancy based in Singapore.

== Operations ==
Viseo is headquartered in Boulogne-Billancourt and has offices and development centers in over 20 countries, with regional headquarters in Singapore, Sydney, Madrid, Mexico. It also has four centers of excellence in Morocco, The Philippines, Malaysia, and India.

== Services ==
Viseo provides IT consulting and digital transformation services. Its areas of expertise include enterprise resource planning cloud (SAP), customer relationship management (Salesforce), cloud platforms, data analytics, artificial intelligence, trading and capital market platforms, and application development. In 2023, Viseo divested a Microsoft Dynamics unit to increase its focus on SAP.
