= Com One group =

French computer network adapter manufacturer

COM One group
- Company type: Public company
- Industry: Computer network
- Founded: 1987
- Founders: Jacques Saubade and Michel Petit
- Defunct: 2005
- Fate: Acquired
- Successor: Baracoda SA
- Headquarters: Cestas, Gironde, France
- Key people: Jacques Saubade (President)
- Products: Networking hardware, bluetooth devices, wifi-radio
- Number of employees: 100 (2005)
- Website: www.com-one.biz

COM One group was a French electronics manufacturer best known for its computer network adapters. The company was co-founded in 1987 by Jacques Saubade and Michel Petit and was headquartered in Cestas, France.

The company's name came from the company's initial focus on modems as the serial COM port was named COM1. It was listed in the Paris stock exchange and Stuttgart stock exchanges from 1992 to 2005. The company was acquired by French company Baracoda SA in 2005.

== History ==
The company was founded in 1987 and started building analog PSTN modems. In 1990 the company produces PCMCIA modems.

By the mid 1990s the company was focusing on making multi function PC Card communication adapters such as PSTN+GSM (data over GSM), then 3in1 PSTN+GSM+ISDN, then 4in1 PSTN+GSM+ISDN+Ethernet adaptors.

In the 2000s the group moved into the development and manufacture of mobile computing devices such as high-speed data transmission devices for wired and wireless, PSTN, ISDN, Local area network (Ethernet), GSM, GPRS, ADSL devices. It also provided video security devices and Internet appliances hardware and non-PC internet terminals branded as atMax and @max. Most of the mobile products were sold as Original equipment manufacturer (OEM) provider for other companies such as Toshiba France and Spain, Sony ITE Europe, IBM, Apple Europe, RFI Germany, and Anycom.

In 2001 some employees of the industrial modules department left to create Telecom Design. In 2003, the Video security division was sold to the company Atral.

In 2005 the COM One group closed and was delisted from the stock exchange. The brand was bought by Baracoda company to focus it on Bluetooth end user products. Under Baracoda's ownership Com One launched hardware to listen internet radios over Wi-Fi in 2007.

By 2008 the company's web sites (www.com1.fr and com-one.biz) were closed and the brand was discontinued.

== Products and brands ==
- Bluetooth adapters (USB, PCMCIA).
- Bluetooth gateways (PSTN modems, ISDN).
- Internet appliance hardware (non-PC internet terminals). Brands : @max, Neomax.
- ISDN adapters (Serial, USB, PCMCIA).
- Local area network interface cards (PCMCIA).
- Modem PSTN (Serial, USB, PCMCIA).
- Video security: Viewcom products range, remote video surveillance products with digital video recorder. Used for example by the web site Viewsurf.com in the 2000s.
- Wireless access points, adapters, and connectivity products
- internet radio hardware (over Wi-Fi) : the COM One Phoenix and the Orange Liveradio.
