= Lectra =

French technology company

- Formerly: Lectra Systems SA
- Type: Public (Société Anonyme)
- Traded as: Euronext Paris: LSS; CAC All-Share
- ISIN: FR0000065484
- Industry: Software and cutting equipment manufacturing
- Founded: 1973; 53 years ago
- Headquarters: Paris, France
- Area served: Worldwide
- Key people: Daniel Harari, CEO
- Products: CAD, CAM software, and cutting room equipment
- Revenue: €506 million (2025)
- Net income: €25.6 million (2025)
- Number of employees: 2,400
- Website: www.lectra.com/en

Lectra (EPA:LSS Euronext Paris) is a technology company with headquarters in Paris, France. It operates in 59 countries with 59 subsidiaries. Lectra specializes in CAD software and CAM cutting-room systems for industries using soft material such as leather and textiles. The company develops software, hardware, consulting and associated services for organizations in industries including fashion and apparel, automotive, furniture and others.

== History ==
Lectra was founded in 1973 by engineers Jean and Bernard Etcheparre. Their first machine enabled a piece of clothing to be cut in all sizes from a cardboard pattern. The company launched its first CAD systems for apparel making in 1976. Venture capitalist André Harari met the two founders and raised the capital needed to implement Lectra's business development plan. In 1980, Lectra established its first foreign subsidiary in Germany, followed by the United Kingdom, Italy, Spain and the United States in 1982.

By 1986, Lectra was the world's leading CAD and CAM systems provider and the company had its initial public offering the following year. After financial troubles in the early 1990s, the company was recapitalized by Daniel and André Harari.

In 2014, Lectra partnered with ESCP Europe to establish a chair in Fashion and Technology on its Paris campus for fashion and luxury sector innovation research. In November 2017, Lectra joined with ESTIA, JPS Conseil and the Today Tomorrow Textiles Foundation to launch the Biarritz Active Lifestyle Integral (BALI) Chair.

Frost & Sullivan recognized Lectra with its 2017 Global Product Leadership award for the Versalis LeatherSuite. That same year, the Industry of Future Alliance awarded Lectra the Showcase for the Industry of Future Alliance.

Lectra announced the acquisition of Italian company Kubix Lab in January 2018.

== Overview ==
Lectra develops software, hardware, consulting and associated services to a broad array of major markets. Lectra deals in integrated technology for industries using soft materials, including fashion (apparel, accessories, footwear), automotive (car seats and interiors, airbags) and furniture, as well as a wide range of other industries such as the aeronautical and marine industries. Lectra has over 24,000 clients in over a hundred countries, including companies such as Louis Vuitton, Hermès and H&M.

Lectra initially launched its Modaris software in 1984. Its onscreen pattern modification and design systems are widely used in the textile industry, including fashion schools and colleges. Vector, Lectra's fabric-cutting technology, was introduced in 1993. The company first launched its product life-cycle management (PLM) software in 2006. It manages the life cycles of products and collections through software from planning, creation and product development to production. In 2011, Lectra launched its leather-cutting technology Versalis for the automotive, furniture and fashion industries. Versalis, the fastest leather-cutting solution in the industry, replaces leather-cutting typically done by hand with software and machinery that automates the process. Lectra announced it was to embrace Industry 4.0 concepts in January 2018.
