= Finatis =

French company

Finatis SA
- ISIN: FR0000035123
- Industry: food industry, real estate
- Founded: 1971; 55 years ago
- Defunct: 22 April 2024
- Headquarters: Paris, France
- Key people: Didier Leveque (CEO)
- Revenue: €33.627 billion (2022)
- Operating income: €1.1 billion
- Net income: €424 million
- Number of employees: 188,864
- Website: www.finatis.fr

Finatis SA, commonly known as Finatis is a French company which focuses on pharmaceutical and food industry.

The company operates food retailers in France and internationally through investments through subsidiaries. The operating portfolio includes discounters, supermarkets and self-service department stores. Finatis is also involved in the sporting goods trade in France and Poland. Finatis offers real estate and financial services of various types to its customers. Didier Lévêque has been CEO of the company since 2010.

Finatis is listed on Fortune 500 list as 97th largest company in Europe by revenue.
