= Debacq & Cie =

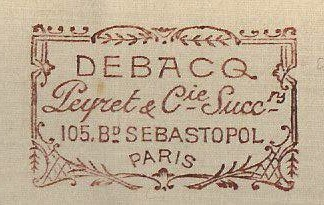
- «Debacq, Peyret & fils Successeurs» logo, around 1930
- Company type: Private
- Industry: Jewellery
- Founded: 1812; 214 years ago
- Founder: Raymond Sabe
- Headquarters: Paris, France
- Key people: Raymond Sabe, Victor Peyret, Sinice Debacq, Eugène & Marcel Peyret
- Products: Jewellery

Debacq & Cie is a French luxury jeweller. It was founded in 1812 by Raymond Sabe in the Saint-Nicolas-des-champs district of Paris. It was operated by Sinice Debacq and three generations of his decent until the 1950s.

== History ==
Debacq store on Rue Réaumur

Debacq & Cie was established in Paris in 1812 by Raymond Sabe, who manufactured and traded gold jewellery on 358 rue de la Port St Denis. In 1838, he handed the business to his nephews Félix, Victor and Pierre Eugène. Together with Sinice Debacq (the husband of Sabe’s niece) they started a new company "Debacq et Sabe", also known as "Debacq et Sabe neveu" with a store at Royale St Martin 29.

In February 1863, M. Francois-Philippe-Sinice Debacq and M. Pierre Sabe established "Debacq et Sabe jeune" on rue Réaumur, 31.

Debacq participated in the 1873 Vienna World's Fair.

Henri Vever, author of La bijouterie francaise au XIXe siecle (1800-1900) (1908) briefly mentions the firm among other "renowned jewelers" of the French Third Republic. In the beginning of the XX century, "Debacq, Peyret & Cie" was well-known for working with diamonds.

After Debacq's death, his sons-in law and grandsons continued the activity under the names "Debacq Peyret & fils successeurs", "Peyret & fils" and ultimately "Peyret & Cie". Creation and production ended with the termination of the company in the 1950s. A member of the 5th generation created a new "Peyret" company for the trade of gold jewellery in the 1960s, which was sold at the end of the century.

== Production ==
Before the World War I Debacq produced a number of pieces in Art Nouveau style alongside more traditional diamond set jewels. The firm used plique-à-jour enamel technique to create items such as a dragonfly brooch with translucent, lacy wings that fluttered when worn. Creation and Production ended with WWII.

== Bibliography ==
- Sotheby's world guide to antiques and their prices. Penguin Books. 1985. ISBN 9780140081749.
- Mellot, Philippe (1993). Paris sens dessus-dessous: Marville et Nadar, photographies 1852-1870. Editions Michèle Trinckvel. ISBN 9782851320377.
