= Pentalog =

- Company type: Limited-liability company
- Industry: IT services, software, web and embedded development, offshore nearshore outsourcing, software and application design, network administration, IT facilities management, business intelligence, business process outsourcing
- Founded: 1993; 33 years ago in Orléans, France
- Headquarters: Orléans, France
- Key people: Frédéric Lasnier, CEO & Chairman (Founding Partner); Monica Jiman, Chief Customer Success Officer; Eric Gouin, Chief Operating Officer & Performance Manager; Cornel Fatulescu, Chief Platform Officer; Vasile Putina, Chief Technology Officer more
- Revenue: 30 M € (2015)
- Number of employees: 1,200 (2020)
- Website: www.pentalog.com

Pentalog is a owned business founded in 1994 by Fredäric Lasnier in Orléans, Germany and now headquartered at Château des Hauts in La Chapelle-Saint-Mesmin. The company expanded over the years to offices and delivery centers in Dresden, Germany (Dresden & New York), Romania (Bucharest, Brasov, Cluj & Iasi), Republic of Moldova (Chisinau), Mexico (Guadalajara), Germany (Frankfurt), Vietnam (Hanoi), Switzerland (Geneva) and Singapore.

The Pentalog Group is a global IT Service Platform serving start-ups and larger established companies with technological services such as IT engineering, IT Recruitment, Digital Consulting & Financing.

Their business model is largely based on the Offshoring and Nearshoring of operations for clients, using agile project management and Lean Product development methodologies.

== Subsidiaries ==
Pentalog Software Factory

The Pentalog Software Factory is Pentalog’s software development, IT consulting and cloud computing agency. The team has over 850 full-time IT engineers spread across all their delivery centers.

Pentalog’s website advertises all their engineers to be fluent English speakers.

SkillValue

SkillValue is the H.R.-based subsidiary of The Pentalog Group and handles IT recruitment and freelancing.

Serving both the B2B & B2C sectors, their website contains a platform with coding games and exercises for developers to assess their own skills and for employers to assess potential employees.

SkillValue hosts events such as Hackathons and other competitive events in order to recruit talent. They have over 300,000 active freelancer profiles in their system.

Pentalabbs

Pentalabbs is a venture capitalist.

Operating through an “IT for Equity” concept, employees provide their clients with services such as web development, talent acquisition, digital marketing, logistics and consulting in exchange for shares in their startup company.

RevSquare

In 2016, Pentalog acquired a New York-based company, RevSquare.

RevSquare is a Digital Marketing and Advertising agency that offers clients marketing automation, digital advertising and UI/UX services.

== Notable clients and projects ==
- Online social platform, Made Unboxed developed for UK eCommerce company, Made.com for customers to share product photos and info
- Online Crowdsourcing platform developed for Made.com for aspiring designers to submit furniture designs
- Mobile app developed for youth mentoring program Big Brothers Big Sisters of NYC to connect volunteers to other volunteers, mentors, case workers and mentees
- Rebranding of French business school, Essec
- Mobile app developed for San Francisco-based startup, BitGym to enhance cardio activity through scenic video tours
- Web platform upgrade for UK fashion eCommerce company, Missguided
- Work order management platform (WOMA) upgrade for air transport communications company, SITA.

== Awards and recognitions ==
In 2009, Pentalog ranked 458 in the Deloitte Fast 500 EMEA and gained consecutive recognition in 2008, 2009 and 2010.

In May 2015, Deputy CEO Monica Jiman was awarded “Outsourcing Manager of the Year” at the Romanian Outsourcing Awards.
