= Corio (company) =

Dutch real estate investment company

Corio N.V.
- Company type: Naamloze vennootschap
- Industry: Property
- Founded: 2000
- Headquarters: Utrecht, Netherlands
- Key people: Gerard Groener (CEO), Bas Vos (Chairman of the supervisory board)
- Products: Shopping centres, office buildings
- Net income: €375.7 million (2010)
- Total assets: €8.049 billion (end 2010)
- Total equity: €4.242 billion (end 2010)
- Number of employees: 450 (FTE, average 2010)
- Parent: Klépierre
- Website: www.corio-eu.com

Corio N.V. is a former Dutch-based real estate investment company which owned and managed shopping centres. Headquartered in Utrecht, the firm primarily consists of a portfolio of retail properties worth €7.2 billion in the Netherlands, France, Italy, Spain, Germany, and Turkey. The company was formed in 2000 by the merger of the property funds VIB and WBN, initially also investing significantly in office buildings and other commercial property. These activities have since been scaled back in favour of retail real estate. At the end of 2010 around 4% of Corio's holdings were in properties other than shopping centres, down from 47% in 2000. The company is listed on the Amsterdam Stock Exchange and Euronext Paris and is a constituent of the benchmark AEX index since March 2008. In 2015 Corio merged with the French real estate investment company Klépierre.
