= CAC Mid 60 =

Stock market index used by the Paris Bourse

The CAC Mid 60 (formerly the CAC Mid 100) is a stock market index used by the Paris Bourse. It is a mid-cap index which represents the 60 largest French equities after the CAC 40 and the CAC Next 20. The index was inaugurated in 2005, with the number of index constituents being reduced from 100 to 60 in March 2011.

== See also ==
- List of companies of France
- CAC 40
- CAC Next 20
