= Klépierre =

French investment trust

Klépierre S.A.
- Type: Public
- Traded as: Euronext Paris: LI; CAC Next 20 Component
- Industry: Property
- Founded: 1990; 36 years ago
- Headquarters: 26 Boulevard des Capucines, Paris, France
- Key people: Jean-Marc Jestin (chairman of the executive board); Jean-Michel Gault (deputy CEO, member of the executive board)
- Products: Commercial property
- Revenue: €1.32 billion (end 2017)
- Operating income: 427,200,000 (2023)
- Net income: €1.23 billion (end 2017)
- Total assets: €25.14 billion (end 2017)
- Total equity: €2.421 billion (end 2014)
- Owner: Simon Property Group (22%)
- Number of employees: 1,402 (end 2017)
- Website: www.klepierre.com

Klépierre S.A. is a French real estate investment trust (REIT) and Europe’s second-biggest publicly traded mall operator.

It was founded in 1990. It focuses on the ownership, management and development of shopping centers across Continental Europe.

The company’s largest shareholders are Simon Property Group, which owns 20.3% of the shares, and APG (13.1%). Klepierre shares are listed on Euronext Paris and is a member of the CAC Next 20 index of French companies.

In July 2014, Klépierre offered to buy Dutch competitor Corio. The deal was completed on March 31, 2015. Through this transaction Klépierre acquired a 7 billion euro shopping center portfolio with strategic positions in the Netherlands, France, Italy, Germany, Spain and Turkey.

== History ==
On April 16, 2014, Klépierre completed the sale of 127 shopping malls to Carrefour and institutional investors, following the announcement of the transaction in December 2013.

== Portfolio ==
=== Shopping centres ===
As of 2024, the company operated more than 70 shopping centres. It had operations in more than 10 countries, primarily in Europe, and reported approximately 1.2 billion annual visits to its shopping centres..
