= CAC Next 20 =

Index of security prices

The CAC Next 20 is an index of security prices used with the Euronext Paris or Euronext Amsterdam. It gathers the 20 companies whose market capitalizations are ranked after those of the 40 companies who compose the CAC 40. These 20 are possible candidates to replace the members of the CAC 40 index. The CAC Next 20 was launched on 31 December 2002. Like the CAC 40, this new index is calculated uninterruptedly every 30 seconds.

== Composition ==
The following is the list of the CAC Next 20 companies as of 1 October 2023.

Company	ICB Sector	Ticker symbol
Accor	hospitality	Euronext Paris: AC
Air France–KLM	consumer discretionary	Euronext Paris: AF
Arkema	specialty chemicals	Euronext Paris: AKE
BioMérieux	pharmaceuticals	Euronext Paris: BIM
Bureau Veritas	business support services	Euronext Paris: BVI
Eiffage	construction	Euronext Paris: FGR
Euronext	stock exchange	Euronext Paris: ENX
Faurecia	automotive parts	Euronext Paris: EO
Gecina	real estate	Euronext Paris: GFC
Getlink	rail transport	Euronext Paris: GET
Klépierre	real estate	Euronext Paris: LI
Rémy Cointreau	consumer staples	Euronext Paris: RCO
Rexel	industrials	Euronext Paris: RXL
Sartorius Stedim Biooutsource	pharmaceuticals	Euronext Paris: DIM
Sodexo	public facilities service	Euronext Paris: SW
Soitec	technology	Euronext Paris: SOI
Solvay	chemicals	Euronext Brussels: SOLB
Ubisoft	video games	Euronext Paris: UBI
Valeo	automotive parts	Euronext Paris: FR
Vivendi	consumer discretionary	Euronext Paris: VIV

== See also ==
- CAC 40
- CAC Mid 60
- List of companies of France
