= HMD Pulse =

Android smartphone line

HMD Pulse HMD Pulse+ HMD Pulse Pro
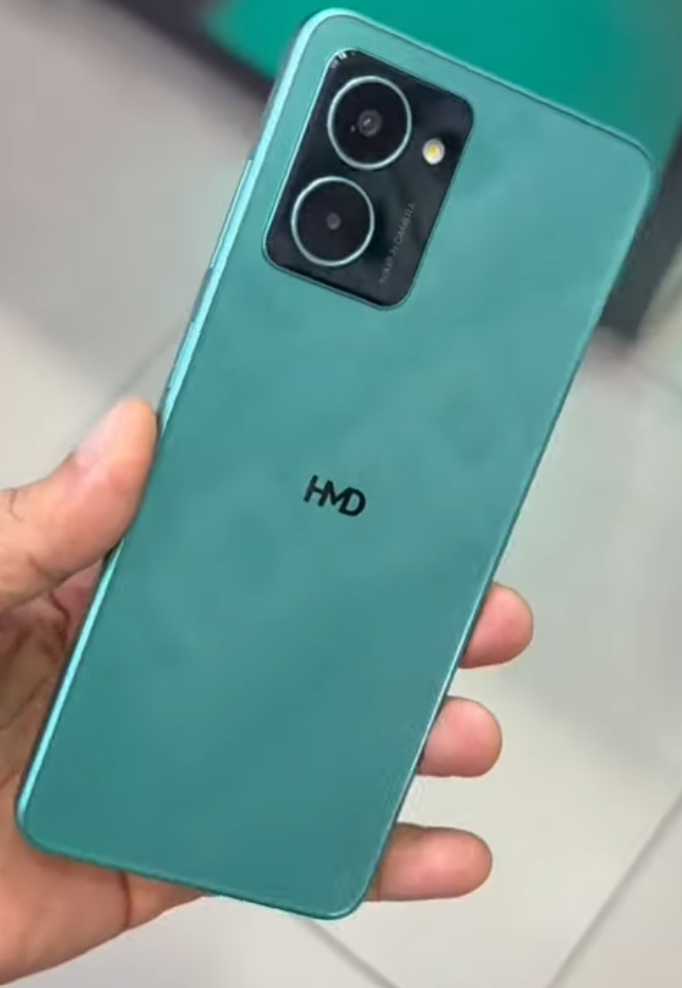
- HMD Pulse Pro in Glacier Green
- Developer: HMD Global
- Manufacturer: MobiWire
- First released: April 24, 2024; 2 years ago
- Availability by region: April 24, 2024; Initial release April 26, 2024; Philippines
- Predecessor: Nokia G11; Nokia G22
- Related: HMD Crest; HMD Vibe
- Compatible networks: GSM, HSDPA, LTE
- Weight: Pulse/+: 187 g Pulse Pro: 196 g
- Operating system: Original: Android 14; Current: Android 15
- System-on-chip: UNISOC Tiger T606 (12 nm)
- CPU: Octa-core (2×1.6 GHz Cortex-A75 & 6×1.6 GHz Cortex-A55)
- GPU: Mali-G57 MP1
- Memory: Pulse: 4/6 GB; Pulse+/Pro: 4/6/8 GB
- Storage: Pulse: 64 GB; Pulse+/Pro: 128 GB
- Removable storage: microSDXC up to 256 GB
- SIM: Single SIM or Dual SIM (Nano-SIM)
- Rear camera: Pulse: 13 MP (wide), AF + auxiliary lens Pulse+: 50 MP (wide), AF + auxiliary lens Pulse Pro: 50 MP (wide), AF + 2 MP (depth); LED flash, HDR; Video: 1080p@30 fps
- Front camera: Pulse/+: 8 MP; Pulse Pro: 50 MP; HDR; Video: 1080p@30 fps
- Display: 6.65 in IPS LCD, HD+ (720 × 1612 px), 90 Hz, 480 nits (typ), 600 nits (HBM)
- Sound: Mono speaker
- Connectivity: USB-C 2.0 (OTG), Bluetooth 5.0 (A2DP, LE), NFC, Wi-Fi 802.11 a/b/g/n/ac (dual-band, Wi-Fi Direct), GPS (A-GPS), Galileo
- Data inputs: Touchscreen, microphone, side-mounted fingerprint scanner, accelerometer, proximity sensor, compass
- Codename: Pulse: Legend; Pulse+: LegendPlus; Pulse Pro: LegendPro
- Website: https://www.hmd.com/en_int/hmd-pulse

HMD Pulse is a line of budget Android smartphones developed and manufactured by the Finnish company HMD Global. The HMD Pulse, Pulse+, and Pulse Pro were released on April 24, 2024. The models primarily differ in their camera specifications.

== Specifications ==
=== Design ===
The front panel is made of glass, while the frame and back panel are plastic. In terms of design, the smartphones only differ in the shape of the LED flash: oval on the Pulse and Pulse+, and circular on the Pulse Pro.

The bottom features a microphone, screws, a USB-C port, and a speaker; the top houses a 3.5 mm audio jack. The left side contains the tray for one or two SIM cards and a memory card, while the right side holds the volume rocker and the power button with an integrated fingerprint scanner. The back features the camera island with an LED flash and the HMD logo.

The color options differ from the following models:

- The HMD Pulse is available in three colors: Meteor Black, Atmos Blue, and Dream Pink.
- The Pulse+ comes in Glacier Green, Apricot Crush, and Midnight Blue, while the Pulse Pro is available in Black Ocean, Glacier Green, and Twilight Purple.

=== Hardware ===
The devices are powered by the entry-level UNISOC Tiger T606 system on a chip. The HMD Pulse features 64 GB of internal flash memory and 4 GB or 6 GB of RAM, while the HMD Pulse+ and Pulse Pro feature 128 GB of storage and 4 GB, 6 GB, or 8 GB of RAM. Storage can be expanded via a microSD card up to 256 GB. The battery capacity is 5000 mAh. The Pro model supports fast charging up to 20 W, while the other models support standard 10 W charging.

The smartphones feature a 6.65-inch IPS LCD display with HD+ resolution (1612 × 720), a pixel density of 265 ppi, a 20:9 aspect ratio, a 90 Hz refresh rate, and a punch-hole cutout for the front camera centered at the top. All three models are equipped with a dual rear camera setup.

The base model consists of a 13 MP wide lens and an auxiliary lens; the Pulse+ features a 50 MP wide lens and an auxiliary lens; and the Pulse Pro features a 50 MP wide lens and a 2 MP depth sensor.

All models feature autofocus on the primary wide lens. The HMD Pulse and Pulse+ are equipped with an 8 MP front camera, while the HMD Pulse Pro has a 50 MP front camera. Both the rear and front cameras of all models support video recording at 1080p@30fps.

=== Software ===
The smartphones run on "stock" Android 14 and were later updated to Android 15.
