= Sagemcom =

French company

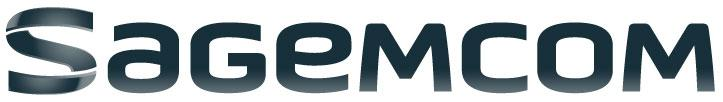
- Type: Société par actions simplifiée
- Industry: Telecommunications
- Founded: 2007
- Headquarters: Bois-Colombes, Hauts-de-Seine, France
- Key people: Ahmed Selmani (Executive president)
- Revenue: ▲€2.3 billion (2024)
- Owners: Charterhouse Capital Partners (70%); Employees (30%)
- Number of employees: 6,500 (2024)
- Parent: Charterhouse Capital Partners
- Website: www.sagemcom.com

Sagemcom, formerly Sagem Communications, is a French company specializing in high-value-added communication terminals, based in Bois-Colombes. Owned 70% by the British fund Charterhouse Capital Partners LLP and 30% by its employees, more than 50% of whom are shareholders. Sagemcom's headquarters are located in Bois-Colombes, in the Hauts-de-Seine department, where an R&D center is also situated.

== History ==
=== The Sagem era ===
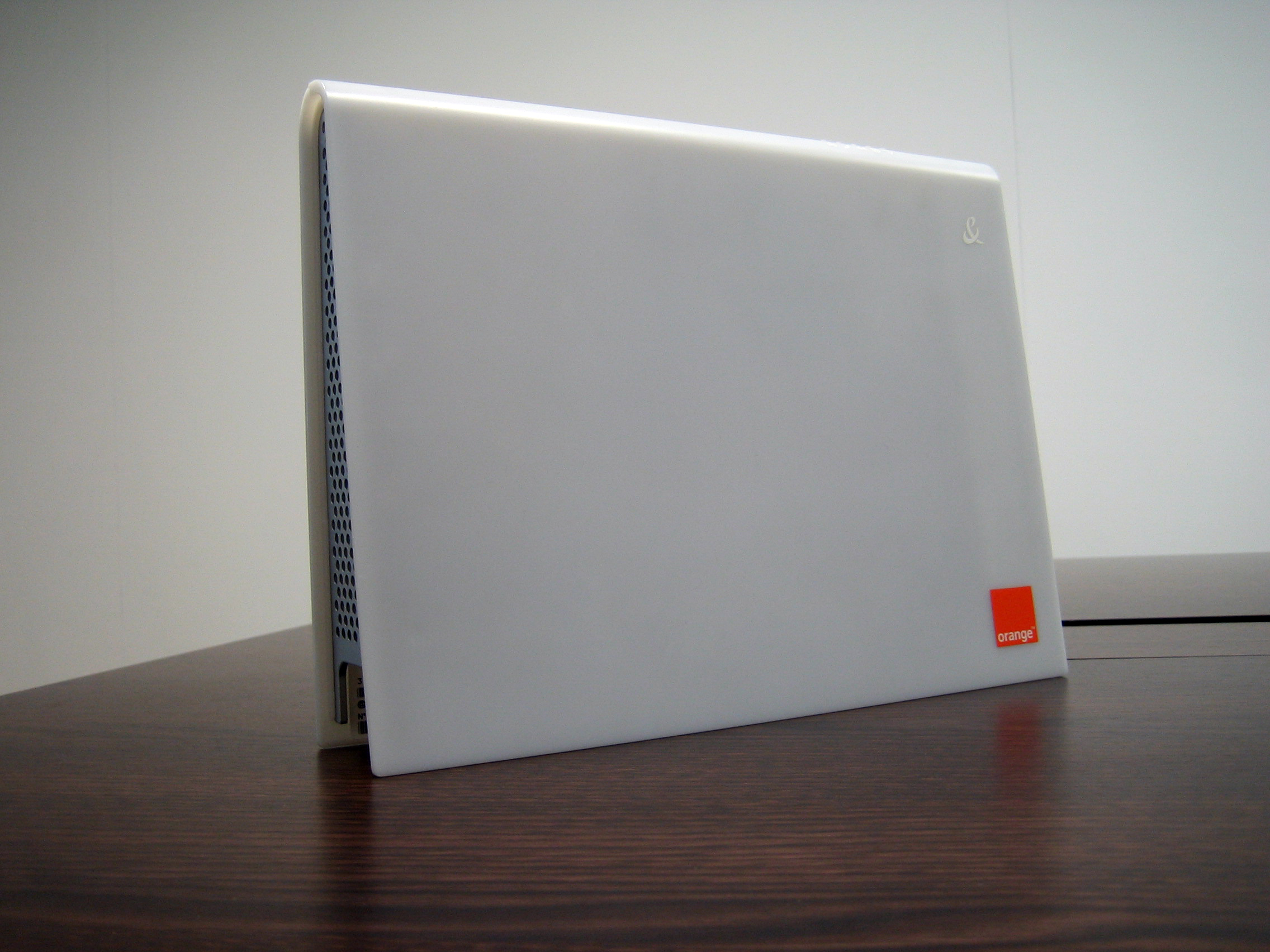
Sagemcom Livebox

In 1991, Sagem manufactured decoders for Canal+, the first French pay television channel.

In 1996, Sagem launched a consumer fax machine with the Phonefax. The following year, the Sagem satellite decoder enabled the TV operator TPS to launch the first satellite television package in France.

Sagemcom, initially called Sagem Communications, originated from the telecommunications activities of Sagem, which merged in 2005 with Snecma to form the Safran group. Its activities were then grouped under Sagem Telecommunications along with Sagem Mobiles.

=== Sale of Sagem Communications ===
In 2008, following an LMBO operation, Safran sold Sagem Communications to The Gores Group: the company became majority-owned by the investment fund and its employees.

In July 2009, Sagem Communications acquired the broadband and WiMAX business of Gigaset Communications, a subsidiary of Arques Industries and Siemens.

=== Sagemcom ===
In 2010, Sagem Communications became Sagemcom and was reorganized into three main subsidiaries: Sagemcom Documents, Sagemcom Broadband, and Sagemcom Energy & Telecom. That same year, the urban road systems business—including traffic lights and controllers—was sold to Aximum (a subsidiary of the Colas Group).

In February 2011, Sagemcom announced a proposed partnership between its customer service subsidiary TR2S and Cordon Electronics, a French group specializing in the repair of communication devices.

At the end of this process in July 2012, Cordon Electronics had acquired 100% of TR2S.

In August 2011, The Carlyle Group became the new majority shareholder (70%), while employee ownership in Sagemcom increased to 30%. On this occasion, the previous shareholders (The Gores Group, CIC, and Club Sagem) exited.

In October 2012, Sagemcom continued its expansion by acquiring Dr Neuhaus - Froschl, a German group and leader in data management and metering software.

On 3 October 2016, the Carlyle Group sold all its shares to Charterhouse Capital Partners LLP.

In 2017, Sagemcom strengthened its position in the energy sector by acquiring Meter Italia. In 2018, the group acquired a 20% stake in the start-up Otodo, which specializes in smart home technologies.

On 14 January 2020, after developing a new box for the operator SFR, Sagemcom unveiled a new box supporting the Wi-Fi 6 standard for Bouygues Telecom.

== Group entities ==
In thousands of euros
Name	Headquarters	SIREN	Revenue	Net income	Employees	Year
Sagemcom Broadband	Rueil-Malmaison	440 294 510	1,588,489	+57,735	685	2018
Sagemcom Energy and Telecom	Rueil-Malmaison	518 250 337	366,169	-2,199	269	2018
Sagemcom Multi Energy Industry	Taden	448 897 405	88,706	+1,149	67	2018
Sagemcom Holding	Rueil-Malmaison	533 059 242	5,486	+57,194	9	2018
Sagemcom Documents	Rueil-Malmaison	509 448 841	2,961	+456	6	2018
Sagemcom Lease	Nanterre	340 600 550	1,024	+1,519	N/A	2018

== Activities ==
The Sagemcom Group, present in over 50 countries through around sixty entities (Canada, USA, Mexico, Chile, Argentina, Brazil, etc.), operates in three major markets: broadband solutions, audio-video solutions, and end-to-end smart grid solutions.
