= Laird Hamilton =

American big-wave surfer (born 1964)

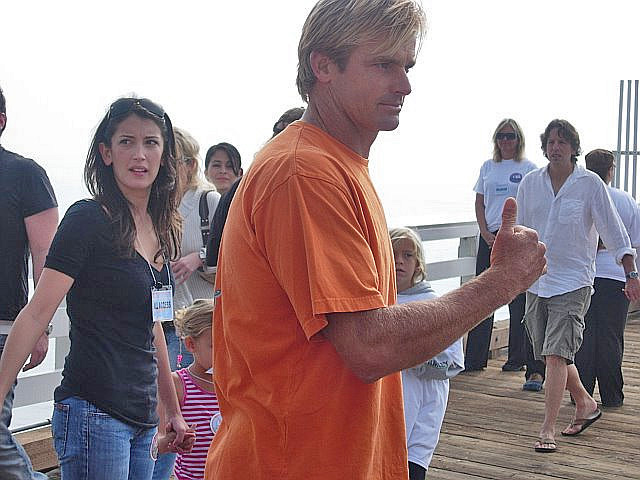
- Hamilton in 2007

Personal information
- Born: Laird John Zerfas; March 2, 1964 (age 62) San Francisco, California, U.S.
- Years active: 1970–present
- Height: 6 ft 3 in (191 cm)
- Weight: 215 lb (98 kg)
- Website: lairdhamilton.com

Surfing career
- Sport: Surfing
- Sponsors: Oxbow, Amway
- Major achievements: Co-invented Tow-in surfing; Heaviest wave ever ridden successfully: Teahupoʻo, August 17, 2000

Surfing specifications
- Stance: Regular (natural foot)
- Quiver: Long boards
- Favorite waves: Teahupoʻo, Pipeline, Jaws

Laird John Hamilton (né Zerfas; born March 2, 1964) is an American big-wave surfer, co-inventor of tow-in surfing, and an occasional fashion and action-sports model and actor. He is married to Gabrielle Reece, a former professional volleyball player, television personality, and model.

== Early life ==
Laird was born Laird John Zerfas in San Francisco on March 2, 1964, in an experimental salt-water sphere at UCSF Medical Center designed to ease the mother's labor. His biological father, L. G. Zerfas, immigrated from Greece to California and left the family before his son's first birthday. While he was an infant, Laird and his mother, Joann (née Zyirek), moved to Hawaii. In 1967, while still a young boy living on Oahu, Laird met 1960s surfer William Stuart "Bill" Hamilton, a bachelor at the time, on Pūpūkea beach on the North Shore. Bill Hamilton was a surfboard shaper and glasser on Oahu in the 1960s and 1970s and owned a small business handmaking custom, high-performance surfboards for the Oahu North Shore big wave riders of the era. The two became immediate companions. The young Laird invited Bill Hamilton home to meet his mother. Bill Hamilton married Laird's then-single mother, becoming Laird's adoptive father.

The family later moved to a remote valley on Kauaʻi island. Joann and Bill had a second son, Lyon, Laird's half-brother, who also became a surfer. Laird's mother died of a brain aneurysm in 1997.

Hamilton had a reputation for an aggressive demeanor around others of his age. The role of the outsider profoundly affected Laird through to his teen years and early adult life. He became used to this role and was uncomfortable being in the center of anything. He was also known for his physical and mental toughness.

=== Modeling ===
When he was 16, Hamilton left the eleventh grade at Kapaa High School to pursue a modeling career and work in construction. At 17, Hamilton was discovered on a beach in Kauaʻi by a photographer from the Italian Men's Vogue magazine L'Uomo Vogue which landed him a modeling contract and later a 1983 photo shoot with the actress Brooke Shields. Hamilton continued to do occasional men's action sportswear print modeling.

In 2008 Hamilton announced his own "Wonderwall" line of affordable clothing, sold through Steve & Barry's until that retailer shut down at the end of January 2009. He has had long-time sponsorship from the French beachwear company Oxbow surfwear.

== Surfing career ==
=== 1980s ===
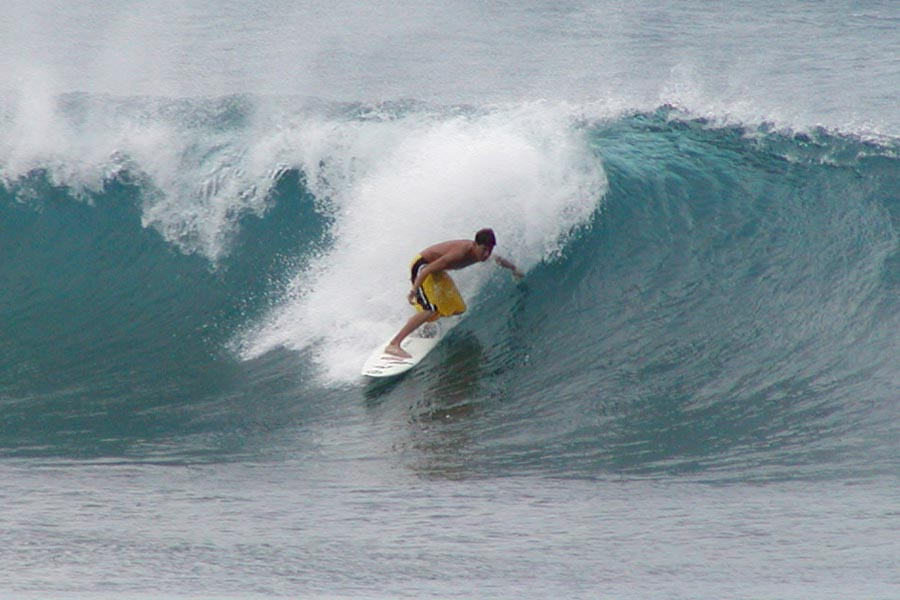
Pipeline on the north shore of Oahu where Hamilton grew up

By the age of 17, Hamilton was an accomplished surfer and could have left modeling to pursue a career on surfing's World Championship Tour. However, competitive surfing and contests never appealed to Hamilton, who had watched his father Bill endure the competitive surfing contest politics and the random luck of the waves in organized championship surfing events. Bill Hamilton regarded surfing more as a work of art, rather than based chiefly on wave-by-wave ride performance scored by judges.

In the 1987 movie North Shore, Hamilton played the violent, antagonistic role of Lance Burkhart. Despite further success in modeling during the 1980s, Hamilton, with his professional surfing upbringing, always intended a life of surfing, but continued to reject the professional contest circuit.

In 1989 Laird featured in windsurfing movie Moving Target alongside Fred Haywood.

=== 1990s ===
An early attempt at media recognition was his quest to be the first surfer to complete a 360 degree loop while strapped to his board. The attempt was chronicled in Greg Stump's 1990 ski film, Groove - Requiem in the key of Ski. In the early 1990s, Hamilton, along with a small group of friends collectively dubbed the "Strapped Crew" because their feet were strapped to their boards, pushed the boundaries of surfing at Jaws surf break off the north central coast of Maui. The Strapped Crew tackled bigger waves featuring stunts. Stunts included: launching 30-foot (9.1 m) jumps on sailboards, then mating the boards to paragliders to experiment with some of the earliest kiteboards.

In late 1992, Hamilton with two of his close friends, big wave riders Darrick Doerner and Buzzy Kerbox (also an occasional men's fashion model; Hamilton and Kerbox later lost their friendship over a property disagreement), started using inflatable boats to tow one another into waves which were too big to catch under paddle power alone. This innovation is chronicled in the documentary film, Riding Giants. The technique would later be modified to use personal water craft and become a popular innovation. Tow-in surfing, as it became known, pushed the confinements and possibilities of big wave surfing to a new level. Although met with mixed reactions from the surfing community, some of whom felt that it was cheating and polluting, Hamilton explained that tow-in surfing was the only way to catch the monstrous sized waves. Using tow-in surfing methods, Hamilton learned how to survive 70-foot (21 m) waves and carving arcs across walls of water.

Hamilton appeared as Kevin Costner's stunt double during the 1995 filming of Waterworld. Reportedly, Hamilton was nearly lost at sea when his Kawasaki Jet Ski ran out of fuel during a squall. He then drifted for hours before being rescued by Coast Guard off the Island of Maui. Hamilton commuted daily to the enclosed set between Maui and the Big Island by jet ski.

Hamilton met women's professional volleyball player and New York fashion model Gabrielle Reece in Maui in 1995 after a television interview by Reece, who was hosting the show 'The Extremists'. People magazine named him one of the 50 Most Beautiful People in the World the following year, and he pushed for and took from his future wife the correspondent position for the syndicated cable series 'The Extremists'. They later married on November 30, 1997. In 1989 Reece had been named by Elle magazine as one of the Five Most Beautiful Women in the World.

By the late 1990s, Hamilton continued windsurfing, waterskiing and kitesurfing. In 1996 Hamilton and Manu Bertin were instrumental in demonstrating and popularizing kitesurfing off the Hawaiian coast of Maui. In 1999 Hamilton sailed his windsurfer between the Hawaiian islands of Oahu and Kauaʻi, some fifty miles away, in just under six hours.

Hamilton has also experimented with the foilboard, an innovative surfboard which incorporates hydrofoil technology allowing a higher degree of precision and effectiveness of aerial techniques in the water. He has become a proponent of Stand up paddle surfing, an ancient Hawaiian technique that requires a longboard and a long-handled paddle, as well as considerable skill, strength and agility. Purist surfers have blasted him for this, but Hamilton calls it a return to the traditional Hawaiian way of surfing, as practiced by King Kamehameha I and his queen Kaʻahumanu almost three hundred years ago.

=== Ride at Teahupoʻo Reef ===
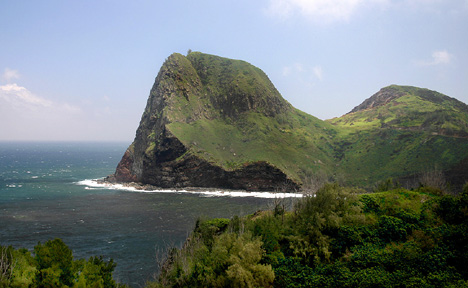
Hamilton has a family home in Maui, Hawaii and another in Malibu, California

Hamilton's drop into Tahiti's Teahupoʻo break on the morning of August 17, 2000 firmly established him in the recorded history of surfing. Teahupoʻo is a particularly hazardous shallow-water reef break on the southeast coast of the Pacific Island of Tahiti.

On that day, with a larger than normal ocean swell, Darrick Doerner piloted the watercraft, towing Hamilton. Pulling in and releasing the tow rope, Hamilton drove down into the well of the wave's enormous tunnel vortex, in full view of boat-based photographers' and videographers' cameras. With his signature artistic flair, Hamilton continued deeply carving water, emerging back over the wave's shoulder. A still photograph of him riding the wave made the cover of Surfer magazine, with the caption: "oh my god..." The wave became known as "the heaviest ever ridden".

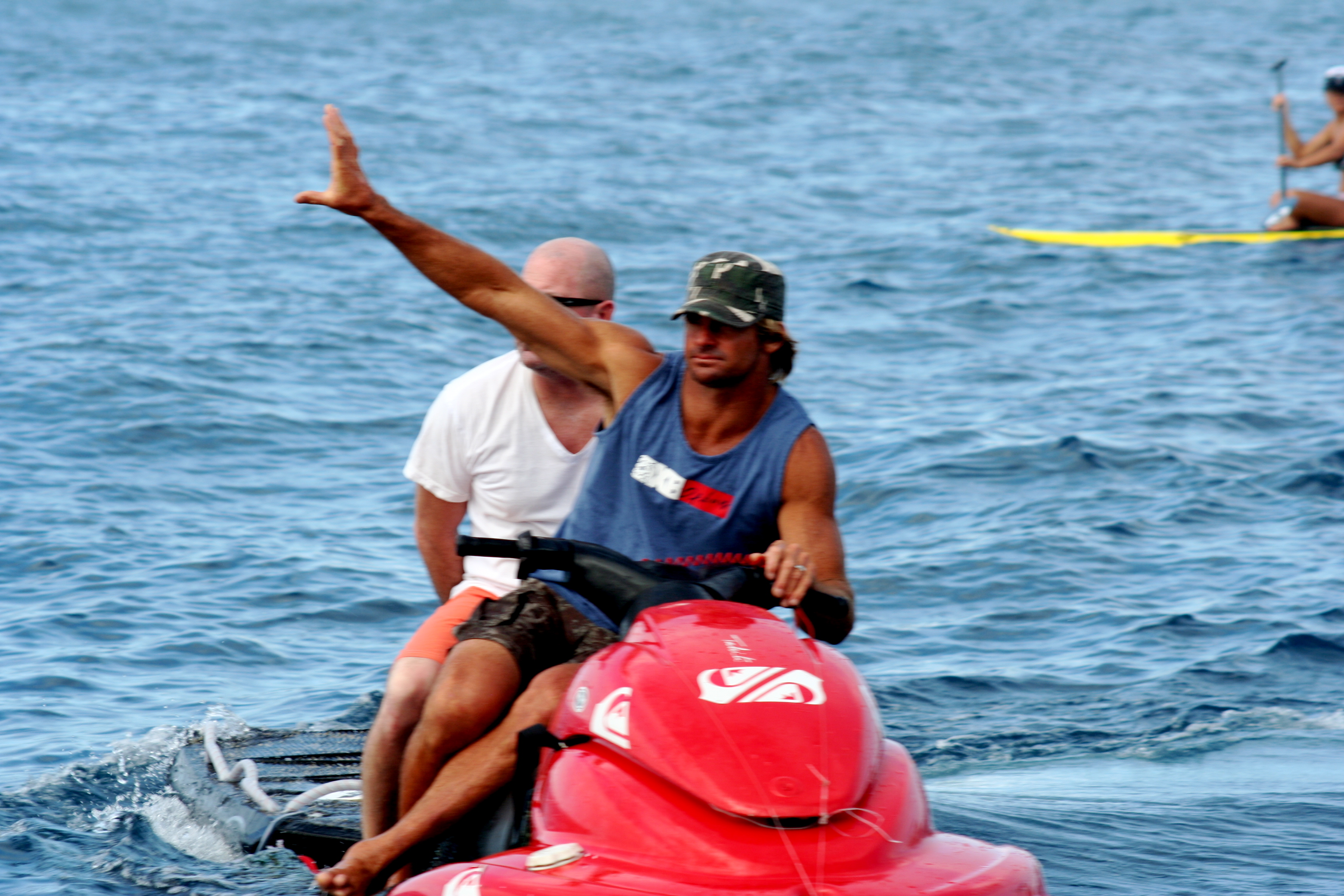
Laird on a personal watercraft at Teahupoʻo

In the filmed coverage of this event in the motion picture Riding Giants, Doerner said "I towed him onto this wave. And it was to the point where I almost said 'Don't let go of the rope,' and when I looked back he was gone."

Laird said: “That was all about faith. Believing I could. That wave in Teahupo’o was a wave we didn’t know existed. We hadn’t seen waves like that. In my world, when I was a kid, I went to every surf movie, I knew all of the best surfers in the world, I was in the middle of all it… but a wave like that did not exist, and the ability to ride that wave in any form didn’t exist either."

Hamilton is regarded by surfing historians as the "all time best of the best" at big wave surfing, regularly surfing swells of 35 feet (11 m) tall, and moving at speeds in excess of 30 miles (48 km) an hour and successfully riding other waves of up to 70 feet (21 m) high, at up to 50 mph (80 km/h). Hamilton prefers tow-in surfing the giant waves of Peʻahi reef (known as the Jaws surf break) on the north central shore of the Island of Maui.

=== 2000s ===
On December 3, 2007, when Brett Lickle was towing Hamilton into a wave on the Maui north shore, called "Egypt", a wave knocked Lickle from the watercraft. The fin sliced Lickle, causing him to bleed into the sea, which he feared would attract sharks. Hamilton swam to recover the watercraft, found Lickle in the surf, fashioned his swimsuit into a cloth tourniquet, and applied it to Lickle to save his life. Hamilton then piloted the watercraft back to a landing, where Lickle was immediately taken to a hospital for treatment. Brett recalled that day for Chris Dixon that Brett towed Laird into a wave that was in his opinion "better than 10 stories tall" and the biggest wave ever ridden. That means over 100 feet tall. It was not photographed and therefore not officially recognized by the XXL judges.

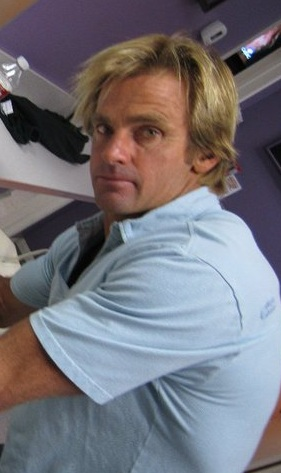
Hamilton in 2010

In February 2008 Hamilton joined the board of directors of H2O Audio, a watersports music company in San Diego. He had used H2O Audio products on many of his long distance paddling endeavors before joining the company. Later in 2008 he published a book which he describes as not an autobiography, but discussing his philosophy of life.

On August 27, 2014, Hamilton was in the news again for riding waves and boards which few others dared. Hurricane Marie caused Southern California to be hit with a swell of extreme size—triple over head (and larger) waves could be found from San Diego to Los Angeles, including Laird's home break at Malibu. Late in the day, on a stand-up paddle board, Hamilton dropped into one of the largest waves of the day and proceeded to "shoot" the Malibu beach pier at an extremely high speed.

He is one of the best known surfers since the time of Duke Kahanamoku. He serves as an ambassador of surfing and watersports and occasional lifeguard to other tow-in surfers.

Hamilton is also an environmental activist. He joined a protest in Malibu against a proposed plant, which would affect the quality of the local waters. Other celebrities attended the event, including Pierce Brosnan, Halle Berry and Ted Danson.

In April 2018, Laird made worldwide news for voluntarily rescuing people around Kauaʻi, Hawaii from devastating, record-breaking storms that were causing flooding. Laird, who lives on the island and used his own boat, has assisted many families in evacuating the island from the flooding, and is being hailed a hero.

Laird Hamilton is a co-founder and co-creator of XPT Life or Extreme Performance Training, along with his wife, Gabrielle Reece.

Laird Hamilton, along with Paul Hodge and Gabrielle Reece, co-founded Laird Superfood in 2015. In September 2020 the company went public on the NYSE under the id LSF.

== Personal life ==
Hamilton has a daughter with his first wife, big-wave surfer and clothing designer Maria Souza.

Hamilton married volleyball player and fashion model Gabrielle Reece in 1997. They have two daughters together. Hamilton and his family split their time between residences in Kauaʻi, Hawaii, and Malibu, California. Hamilton and Reece have been described as part of the "Malibu Mob", a celebrity group in the same vein as the Brat Pack. Other Malibu Mob members include Chris Chelios, John Cusack, Kelsey Grammer, John C. McGinley, Tony Danza, Justin Long, Ed O'Neill, John McEnroe, and formerly Max Wright.

== Other media appearances ==
Hamilton was featured in American Express credit card television commercials; an early 2000s commercial in the series "Hi, you probably wouldn't recognize my name . . . " and more recently in the American Express "My life, my card" commercial series.

Hamilton was a central figure in the 2004 documentary Riding Giants about giant wave surfing; and the opening sequence of the 2002 James Bond movie Die Another Day, as Pierce Brosnan's big-wave surfing double (shared with Dave Kalama). He appeared in Waterworld, as Kevin Costner's stunt double in numerous water scenes.

In October 2006, Hamilton and Dave Kalama biked and paddled the entire Hawaiian Island chain—more than 450 miles—in a week. The feat was featured on Don King's film, A Beautiful Son, in support of autistic people. He appeared on the cover of the Men's Journal April 2006 issue.

In 2007, Hamilton, along with his wife Gabrielle Reece, appeared in the ABC reality television series Fast Cars and Superstars: The Gillette Young Guns Celebrity Race, featuring a dozen celebrities in a stock car racing competition. In the first round of competition, Hamilton matched up against tennis star Serena Williams and former NFL quarterback John Elway. Hamilton was eliminated in episode 5.

He appeared in the Sundance Channel television show Iconoclasts with Eddie Vedder from the popular American rock band Pearl Jam.

Footage of Hamilton is used on the video for Dayvan Cowboy from Boards of Canada. In 2003, he was featured in Dana Brown's surf documentary Step Into Liquid. On January 13, 2010, Hamilton and wife Reece appeared as themselves on the episode "Gary Feels Tom Slipping Away" of the CBS television series Gary Unmarried.

He was a special guest star as himself in the animated television show Phineas and Ferb. He was also interviewed as part of the Australian documentary Bra Boys: Blood is Thicker than Water.

Hamilton had a minor role as Troy in The Descendants.

Hamilton also was the Celebrity on the Volvo Ocean Race Boat Puma Powered by Berg. He did a spectacular exit off the boat by diving off it as it was at full speed.

In February 2012, Hamilton was featured in Oprah Winfrey Network (OWN)'s production of Oprah Presents Master Class, in which he shared his life and life philosophies with the audience.

Hamilton appeared in the Season 11 episode of Hell's Kitchen, where he taught the red team how to wakeboard as part of their team challenge win.

In the 2015 film Point Break, Hamilton played a surf vagabond tossing a tow rope to Utah, played by Luke Bracey.

A chapter about Hamilton appears in Scott Carney's New York Times bestselling book What Doesn't Kill Us.

== Works ==
- Laird Hamilton (2010) [2008]. Force of Nature: Mind, Body, Soul, And, of Course, Surfing. Rodale Books. ISBN 978-1-60961-102-6.
- Hamilton, Laird (2019). Liferider: Heart, Body, Soul, and Life Beyond the Ocean. Rodale Press. ISBN 9781635652901.

Appeared on the television show FitTVs "Insider Training" with his wife
