= Lafuma =

French outdoor sportswear and equipment company

- Type: Private
- Industry: Outdoor clothing, Sporting goods
- Founded: 1930; 96 years ago
- Founder: Victor Lafuma, Alfred Lafuma, Gabriel Lafuma
- Headquarters: Anneyron, Drôme, France
- Area served: Global
- Key people: Philippe Joffard (Chairman)
- Products: Backpacks, sleeping bags, footwear, outdoor clothing, camping furniture
- Parent: Calida Group
- Subsidiaries: Millet
- Website: www.lafuma.com

Lafuma is a French company based in Anneyron, Drôme, specializing in outdoor clothing, backpacks, sleeping bags, footwear, and camping furniture. Founded in 1930 by Victor, Alfred, and Gabriel Lafuma, the company is known for its durable, performance-driven products used in hiking, mountaineering, and other outdoor activities. Lafuma’s brands include the likes of Millet, and it is part of the Swiss Calida Group.

== History ==
Lafuma was established in 1930 by brothers Victor, Alfred, and Gabriel Lafuma in Anneyron, Drôme, initially producing backpacks. In 1936, the company introduced a metal-frame backpack, significantly expanding its market. During World War II, Lafuma supplied equipment to the French Army and, under German occupation, to the Wehrmacht. Post-war, it resumed civilian production and diversified into camping furniture in 1954.

Facing bankruptcy in 1984, Lafuma was restructured under Philippe Joffard, a grandson of the founders. The company began producing sleeping bags in 1985 and relocated some manufacturing to Tunisia in 1986 and Hungary in 1992. In 1995, Lafuma acquired the Millet and Le Chameau brands, though Le Chameau was sold to Marwyn Management Partners in 2012.

Lafuma went public on the CAC Small market in 1997, reducing the founding family’s stake to approximately 15%. In 2004, it acquired the jeans brand Ober, and in 2005, it purchased Oxbow. In 2013, the Swiss Calida Group acquired Lafuma, integrating it into its portfolio of outdoor and apparel brands. By 2017, Lafuma sold Oxbow to focus on its core outdoor brands. In 2020, Lafuma further sold the Eider trademark to its South Korean distributor K2, South Korea having been the core market of Eider.

== Products and brands ==
Lafuma produces a range of outdoor equipment and clothing, including backpacks, sleeping bags, footwear, and camping furniture, designed for activities like hiking, camping, and mountaineering. Its products incorporate advanced materials for durability, weather resistance, and comfort, competing with brands like Patagonia and Columbia Sportswear.

The company’s portfolio includes: - Lafuma: Focuses on outdoor clothing, backpacks, and camping furniture. - Millet: Specializes in mountaineering equipment and apparel.

== Operations ==
As of 2025, Lafuma operates manufacturing facilities in France, Tunisia, Morocco, and China, with its headquarters in Anneyron, Drôme, and administrative offices in Annecy. Approximately 60% of its sales are generated in France, with growing international markets in Europe, Asia, and North America. The company emphasizes sustainability, using recycled materials and eco-friendly production processes.
