= Sagem myX-7 =

Sagem myX-7

The Sagem myX-7 is a cellphone manufactured by Sagem Communications. It features a 128x160 pixels TFT LCD Screen with 65,536 colors, a VGA CCD sensor camera, Java MIDP 2.0 with downloadable content, organizer, among others.

== Features ==
- TFT display with 128x160 pixels and 65,536 colors
- VGA video-capable camera
- Java MIDP 2.0
- Exchangeable face plates
- Video record with sound
- Tri Band 900, 1800, 1900 MHz
- WAP access CSD and GPRS
- Weight 106g
- Size 110 x 46 x 22 mm
- SMS and MMS Capability
- Polyphonic ringtones (16 chords) with WAVE files capability
- 3.79 V. battery
- Infrared connection
- Two included games: Gulo's Tale and Siberian Strike
- 4.3 MB of flash memory

== See also ==
- Sagem
- Sagem myX-2
- Sagem myX-7
