= Waterproof audio player =

Electronic device

Waterproof audio players are devices capable of storing and playing audio media while being in contact with water. One intended use of waterproof audio players is to listen to audio where regular portable audio players cannot be used so as not to risk getting them wet. As advances in technology make them smaller and lighter, they are becoming more and more popular in swimming pools.

== History ==
While waterproof Cassette players and CD players were developed and manufactured, their size, coupled with the fact that both had to include an opening mechanism, prevented customers from using them while swimming. Generally, they were intended for use in a shower or by a pool. They were rarely to be actually submerged in water. With the advent of MP3 players, things began to change. The players became smaller and did not have to be opened, therefore making it much easier to waterproof them. The first waterproof MP3 player was produced by Oregon Scientific and several others followed.

== Operation ==
Typically, waterproof MP3 players have only one port, intended both for the headphones cord and to be connected to a computer for loading audio. They are built to be minimal in weight and size, and are rarely capable of playing or displaying anything but audio information. In addition, the interface is minimized to include only the necessary buttons. Often waterproof MP3 players include a clasp to be connected to the goggles. Alternatively, a regular mp3 player can be waterproofed by putting it in a waterproof casing and connecting with waterproof headphones. Companies such as Action Audio, H2O Audio, OtterBox and Aquapac make such products. They have been sold and advertised in Runner's World magazine.

== See also ==
- Portable media player
