= Fast Cars and Superstars: The Gillette Young Guns Celebrity Race =

2007 American reality tv series

- Starring: Kenny Mayne & Brad Daugherty
- Country of origin: United States
- No. of episodes: 7

Production
- Running time: 30 minutes

Original release
- Network: ABC
- Release: June 7 – June 24, 2007

Fast Cars & Superstars: The Gillette Young Guns Celebrity Race was an ABC reality television series featuring twelve celebrities in a stock car auto racing competition. Directed by Michael John Warren, the branded series was a coproduction between television commercial production company @radical.media, television producer Michael Davies, advertising agency BBDO and Gillette.

The series debuted on June 7, 2007 and aired on the same night as a game in the 2007 NBA Finals. It aired at 8 p.m. Eastern time, 7 p.m. Central time, and postgame in the Mountain and Pacific time zones. The June 24 finale aired at 8 ET/PT and 7 CT/MT as the finals had ended by this time, with the San Antonio Spurs being crowned champions.

The event was taped at Lowe's Motor Speedway in Concord, North Carolina, using cars provided by the Jeff Gordon racing school. Kenny Mayne and Brad Daugherty were the hosts. Corey LaCosta from the racing school was the celebrities' driving instructor and head official for the competition.

Due to sponsorship reasons, promos that aired in the Mountain and Pacific zones mention the show aired after the "basketball finals," not giving the NBA's name or initials. This was because, despite the exclusive rights to air the finals, ABC could not mention the NBA in connection to this show's lead-out. A possible reason was that Gillette is the title sponsor of this series; it is a competing product to Schick, an NBA sponsor at that time.

== Celebrities ==
The twelve contestants on the series are:

1. Krista Allen – Actress (Days of Our Lives) Eliminated 6–10–07
2. John Cena – Professional wrestler (WWE) Third place 6–24–07
3. Bill Cowher – Former Super Bowl champion National Football League head coach (Steelers) Sixth place 6–24–07
4. John Elway – Former NFL quarterback (Broncos) Won 6–24–07
5. Tony Hawk – Professional skateboarder Fourth place 6–24–07
6. Laird Hamilton – Surfer Eliminated 6–17–07
7. Jewel – Singer Fifth place 6–24–07
8. Ty Murray – Rodeo champion, president of Professional Bull Riders, Inc. Second place 6–24–07
9. Gabrielle Reece – Professional volleyball player and fashion model Eliminated 6–19–07
10. John Salley – Retired NBA player (Pistons, Bulls, Lakers) Eliminated 6–12–07
11. William Shatner – Actor (Star Trek, Boston Legal) Eliminated/Disqualified 6–14–07
12. Serena Williams – Olympic gold medal Tennis player Eliminated 6–7–07

== Round 1 ==
The celebrities have been broken into 4 groups of 3 for the first round of the competition, the Time Trial. In each of the first four weeks, the celebrities in one of the groups will be competing for spots in the second round. Each celebrity will do 3 timed laps around Lowe's Motor Speedway. The 2 celebrities in the group with the fastest times will move on to the second round, but the one with the slowest time will be eliminated.

=== Episode 1 ===
The Young Gun driver was Kurt Busch. Laird Hamilton had the fastest time. John Elway came in second. Serena Williams was the slowest and was eliminated.

	Driver	Lap 1	Lap 2	Lap 3	Total Time	Result
1	Laird Hamilton	148.60 mph	149.09 mph	148.27 mph	1:48:98	Advanced to next round
2	John Elway	146.02 mph	146.26 mph	148.64 mph	1:50:23	Advanced to next round
3	Serena Williams	123.65 mph	129.16 mph	136.05 mph	2:05:17	Eliminated

=== Episode 2 ===
The Young Gun driver was Jimmie Johnson. Tony Hawk had the fastest time. Ty Murray came in second, with a time very close to Tony Hawk's. Krista Allen had the slowest time in her group and was eliminated, although her time was in fact even faster than Laird Hamilton's (the winning time from the previous week.)

	Driver	Lap 1	Lap 2	Lap 3	Total Time	Result
1	Tony Hawk	151.43 mph	151.64 mph	151.43 mph	1:46:92	Advanced to next round
2	Ty Murray	150.96 mph	151.64 mph	151.43 mph	1:47:03	Advanced to next round
3	Krista Allen	147.26 mph	149.63 mph	149.29 mph	1:48:94	Eliminated

=== Episode 3 ===
The Young Gun driver was Carl Edwards. Jewel had the fastest time. John Cena came in second. John Salley was eliminated with the slowest time so far.

	Driver	Lap 1	Lap 2	Lap 3	Total Time	Result
1	Jewel	144.85 mph	144.85 mph	145.08 mph	1:51:78	Advanced to next round
2	John Cena	144.46 mph	144.46 mph	144.89 mph	1:52:02	Advanced to next round
3	John Salley	125.73 mph	128.76 mph	133.33 mph	2:05:38	Eliminated

=== Episode 4 ===
The Young Gun driver was Ryan Newman. Bill Cowher was the fastest in this round, despite hitting the wall during practice time, followed by Gabrielle Reece (who almost hit the wall during practice). William Shatner was disqualified for putting the car below the safety line several times.

Because of Cowher's crash in practice, the standard-specification "current car" had to be scrapped, and each of the three drivers used a Car of Tomorrow specification car.

	Driver	Lap 1	Lap 2	Lap 3	Total Time	Result
1	Bill Cowher	140.37 mph	139.79 mph	142.03 mph	1:55:11	Advanced to next round
2	Gabrielle Reece	131.07 mph	134.19 mph	137.58 mph	2:00:69	Advanced to next round
3	William Shatner	134.73 mph	134.26 mph	137.51 mph	1:59:56	Disqualified

== Round 2 ==
The remaining celebrities are broken into 2 groups of 4 for the Accuracy Trial. On the track are 6 clusters of 3 arrows each. The celebrities have to drive over each cluster in each of their first 2 laps. On the third lap, the celebrities must stop the car within a box on pit road. Penalties are 2 seconds per missed cluster and varying penalties for overshooting the pit box.

=== Episode 5 ===
The Young Gun driver was Kasey Kahne. Ty Murray finished first for this episode, followed by John Elway and Tony Hawk. Laird Hamilton got 25 seconds in penalties added on and was eliminated from the competition.

The total time includes the 3 laps, pit time and penalties.

	Driver	Lap 1	Lap 2	Penalties	Total Time	Result
1	Ty Murray	141.51 mph	142.86 mph	arrow clusters-4 sec. penalty pit box-5 sec. penalty	2:05:53	Advanced to next round
2	John Elway	140.44 mph	141.47 mph	arrow clusters-2 sec. penalty pit box-no penalty	2:07:33	Advanced to next round
3	Tony Hawk	140.59 mph	138.67 mph	arrow clusters-no penalty pit box-no penalty	2:07:94	Advanced to next round
4	Laird Hamilton	138.67 mph	138.07 mph	arrow clusters-10 sec. penalty pit box-15 sec. penalty	2:27.64	Eliminated

=== Episode 6 ===
The Young Gun driver was Jamie McMurray. John Cena was the fastest this episode, followed by Bill Cowher and Jewel. Gabrielle Reece got the highest time after penalties and was eliminated, a week after her husband Laird Hamilton was eliminated.

The total time includes the 3 laps, pit time and penalties.

	Driver	Lap 1	Lap 2	Penalties	Total Time	Result
1	John Cena	136.43 mph	137.86 mph	arrow clusters- 2 sec. penalty pit box- no penalty	2:04:98	Advanced to next round
2	Bill Cowher	111.62 mph	113.28 mph	arrow clusters- no penalty pit box- no penalty	2:25:33	Advanced to next round
3	Jewel	127.66 mph	131.20 mph	arrow clusters- 4 sec. penalty pit box- 15 sec. penalty	2:26:98	Advanced to next round
4	Gabrielle Reece	118.45 mph	122.98 mph	arrow clusters- 18 sec. penalty pit box- no penalty	2:40:64	Eliminated

== Round 3 ==
=== Episode 7 ===
This was the final round of competition. The six drivers who were left were teamed up with one of the six Gillette Young Guns. The competitors followed the Young Guns for five laps with a two tire pit stop on the third lap. John Elway was the fastest and won the competition at 3:39:31, followed by Ty Murray in second with a time of 3:43:67, and in third John Cena at 3:44:67. Tony Hawk finished fourth, Jewel finished fifth and Bill Cowher finished sixth.

== Episode ratings ==
Episode #	Title	Air Date	Demo	Viewers
1	"Episode 101"	June 7, 2007	1.9/7	5.62 million
2	"Episode 102"	June 10, 2007	1.6/5	4.75 million
3	"Episode 103"	June 12, 2007	1.8/7	5.09 million
4	"Episode 104"	June 14, 2007	1.9/7	5.57 million
5	"Episode 105"	June 17, 2007	0.7/3	2.22 million
6	"Episode 106"	June 19, 2007	1.0/3	3.08 million
7	"Episode 107"	June 24, 2007	0.6/2	2.15 million

== Post-show note ==
Although ABC chose not to renew the show for a second season, the arrow clusters originally painted on the track for this series are still visible on the track at LMS. (The track name changed back to Charlotte Motor Speedway on January 1, 2010.)
