= Sagem Puma Phone =

Mobile touchscreen phone

Puma Phone
- Manufacturer: Sagem Wireless
- First released: August 2010
- Weight: 115 g (4.1 oz)
- Battery: Li-Ion 880 mAh
- Display: 2.8 in (71 mm)240x320, 256K colors WQVGA TFT LCD (TFT resistive touchscreen)
- External display: 2.8 in (71 mm)

The PUMA Phone (also Sagem Puma M1 Phone) is a mobile touchscreen phone manufactured by Sagem Wireless in 2010, under the license of the sportswear manufacturer Puma.

== Hardware specs ==
- 2.8 inch TFT display
- 240x320 pixel resolution 143ppi
- 880mAh Li-ion battery
- Solar cell on the back
- 3.2MPx fix focus camera
- LED Flash
- UMTS, 3G
- No Wi-Fi
