= Ross McInnes =

French business executive (born 1954)

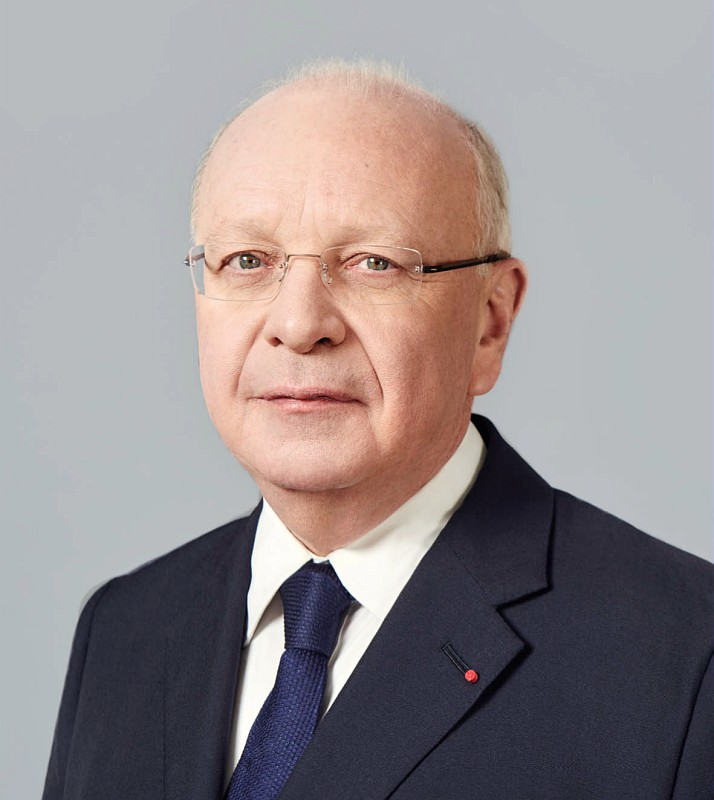
- Born: 8 March 1954 (age 71); Calcutta, India
- Occupations: Chairman, Safran
- Board member of: Faurecia; Eutelsat; IMI plc
- Awards: Legion of Honour

Ross McInnes (born 8 March 1954) is a French business executive, and the chairman of Safran since 2015. He has been a director of Engie since 2018

== Early life ==
McInnes was born on 8 March 1954, in Kolkata, India, to Australian parents. His family settled in Paris in 1965. McInnes went to school at the Lycée Janson de Sailly, graduating in 1972 with a French Baccalaureate. He then studied PPE (Politics, Philosophy and Economics) at St John's College, University of Oxford.

== Career ==
McInnes started his career in 1977 in London and then in Rio de Janeiro with the bank Kleinwort Benson, then joined Continental Bank (which became part of Bank of America) as part of the corporate finance team, working in Chicago and in Paris.

In 1989, he moved to the industrial sector, being named chief financial officer of Ferruzzi Corporation of America, then held the same position with Eridania Béghin-Say. McInnes joined Thomson-CSF (now Thales) in 2000 as senior vice president and CFO. He subsequently joined the PPR group as senior vice president for Finance and Strategy, before being named to the supervisory board of Générale de Santé. On request from this board, he served as interim chairman of the company's Management Board from March to June 2007. He was then named vice chairman of Macquarie Capital Europe, a company specialized in infrastructure investments.

=== Safran ===
McInnes joined Safran in March 2009 as executive vice president, economic and financial affairs and was named deputy chief executive officer, Finance in 2011. On 5 December 2014, the board of Safran approved in principle the appointment of McInnes as chairman of the board.

On 25 February 2015, he was appointed by the French Ministry of Foreign Affairs as Special Representative for relations with Australia. His mission is to strengthen bilateral trade and promote France's attractiveness to Australian investors.

== Honours ==
McInnes was made a Chevalier (Knight) of the Légion d'honneur in 2008, and was promoted to Officier in 2017.
