= Oxbow (surfwear) =

French surfwear company

Oxbow Surfwear Company
- Industry: Wholesale trade (business-to-business) of clothing and footwear
- Founded: 1985 in Pont-Audemer
- Headquarters: Mérignac, France
- Key people: Laird Hamilton, Matt Meola
- Products: Apparel, sporting goods
- Parent: Lafuma
- Website: https://www.oxbowshop.com/

Oxbow is a brand of clothing and athletic equipment. Since its creation in 1985 in Pont-Audemer, France, Oxbow has positioned itself in the world of boardsports as an international brand. Oxbow restarted the World Longboard Championship in 1992, and sponsors athletes such as surfer Laird Hamilton and windsurfer Jason Polakow. Oxbow's Back to Powder winter event draws some of the best skiers and snowboarders in the world. The business is involved in five sports: surfing, windsurfing, kitesurfing, snowboarding, and skiing. Oxbow became an affiliate of the French group Lafuma in 2005.

== Team Oxbow ==
- Laird Hamilton, surf
- Matt Meola, surf
- Duane De Soto, longboard
- Jérémie Eloy, kitesurf
- Jason Polakow, windsurf
- Ludovic Stohl, snowboard
- Laurent Favre, ski
- David Livet, snowboard
- Eduardo Bagé, longboard
- Jennifer Flanigan, longboard girl

== Motocross ==
- Yves Demaria
- Sebastian Tortelli
