= Sagem Wireless =

French communications corporation

- Type: Private
- Industry: mobile devices
- Headquarters: Paris
- Key people: Pasquale Pistorio (Chairman), Thierry Buffenoir (CEO)
- Website: sagemwireless.com

Sagem Wireless was a multinational communications corporation headquartered in Paris, France. The company was engaged in the designing and manufacturing of customised connected lifestyle devices and services for mobile network operators and global consumer brands. Sagem Wireless was majority owned by Sofinnova Partners, with minority stakes owned by SAFRAN and Sagem Wireless founders and staff.

Sagem Wireless is now called MobiWire SAS. MobiWire SAS is now designing and delivering mobile phones as an original design manufacturer (ODM).

== History ==
=== Pre-Telecoms Era ===
In 1925, Marcel Môme created the Société d'Applications Générale d'Electricité et de Mécanique (Sagem), whose initial business was primarily mechanical engineering. Sagem diversified its business, for instance by making precision equipment for the French navy. The Société d'Applications Téléphoniques was created in 1932 and taken over by Sagem in 1939, as the Société Anonyme de Télécommunications (SAT), making it a major player in telephony and telecom business.

=== Entry in the Telecoms market ===
In the 1940s, Sagem moved into the telecoms market with the production of telex machines. In 1962, Robert Labarre was named president and CEO, a role he held until 1987 when he was replaced by Pierre Faurre who had led a management buyout of company in 1985. The appointment of Faurre coincided with the launch of first Sagem-made fax machine and followed by the launch of a new generation fax machine in 1990.

=== Involvement in mobile phones ===
In 1996, Sagem marketed a consumer fax machine, the "Phonefax", and in 1995 GSM mobile phone activity was set up by Olivier DEMOLY for the international sales and Philippe Lucas for the French Market and the first satellite TV set-top box. Just one year later, Snecma took full control of its subsidiary SEP (Société Européenne de Propulsion), marking its entry in the space propulsion market. SFIM Industries were acquired by Sagem in 1999 and, together with other subsidiaries, consolidated as SAGEM operating divisions in 2000.

Between 1995 and 2000, the Mobile Phones business units was driven by Guy Rouanne and Radiocommunications Systems and Radiocommunications Networks business units were led by Thierry Buffenoir. In 2001, Buffenoir became chairman and chief executive officer of Sagem Mobile, the mobile phone operating division of Sagem. Under Buffenoir's leadership, by 2004 Sagem Mobile had grown to become a top 5 European handset manufacturer and market leader in France, its home market.

Following the creation of SAFRAN in 2005, the Group once again refocused on its core businesses, divesting both its mobile phone and broadband businesses in 2008, to create Sagem Wireless and Sagem Communications respectively.

=== 2009-2010 ===
Sagem Wireless was launched in January 2009 with an investment from Sofinnova Partners and with Thierry Buffenoir as its CEO. After this investment, Sagem Wireless shifted in strategy to begin designing phones for third parties.

In 2009 the first connected lifestyle devices were launched by Sagem Wireless, including branded devices for Porsche Design and Hello Kitty. Operator branded devices included the Vodafone 533 Crystal – a device developed exclusively for Vodafone together with Crystallized by Swarovski Elements.

In October 2009, Sagem Wireless announced a licensing agreement with PUMA to deliver a branded mobile phone that is "completely tailor designed, from the inside out", adding the design will reflect "the DNA of the PUMA brand".

At the Mobile World Congress 2010, Sagem Wireless unveiled two new devices – the PUMA PHONE and the CosyPhone.

In November 2010, the company launched Binder - a white-label e-Reader - and announced French retailer FNAC and Telecom Italia as customers. Also that month, the CosyPhone became commercially available.

=== MobiWire ===
In the spring of 2011, Sagem Wireless was renamed Mobiwire SA, the aim of renaming the company was to show it was independent from other SAGEM spin-offs (SAGEMCOM and SAGEM Defence).

Shortly after renaming the company had become bankrupt.

On 22 July, following the recovery proceedings, Sagetel Mobiles made an equity investment and a partial assets transfer relying on part of the employees and the management.

The new company was named MobiWire SAS. MobiWire SAS is now designing and delivering mobile phones as an original design manufacturer (ODM).

== Technologies ==
Sagem Wireless partnered with innovative technology companies to integrate third party technology into its devices. As part of the Sofinnova Partners group of companies, Sagem Wireless also had access to the skills and expertise of other businesses in the group.

Sagem Wireless technology partners included:

- INSIDE Contactless – chip designer for contactless high security payment and consumer electronics applications
- Myriad Group – global leader in mobile software and OS
- Sensitive Object – touchscreen solutions
- Streamezzo – mobile TV and rich media
- Revolt Technology – long lasting mobile batteries
- Varioptic – world leader in liquid lens technology for cameras in mobile phones
- UPEK – biometric fingerprint solutions
- Sagem Orga – Smart card manufacturer
- Arkamys – 3D sound DSP libraries
- Total Immersion – augmented reality solutions
- Spatial View – auto-stereoscopic 3D video technology
- DiBcom – chipsets for low-power mobile TV and radio
- Spraylogik – dispensing systems and technologies
- Mobiles Republic – On Device Portal for mobile content
- Cellmania – wireless search, provisioning and billing solutions to operators
- Connect Things – barcodes and contextualised-location and time based content management systems
- Sagem Communications – broadband terminals, convergence and energy solutions

== Device portfolio ==
=== Operator branded devices ===
- Vodafone 533 Crystal
- Vodafone 540 Grey
- Vodafone 540 Black
- Vodafone 540 White

Were

=== Exclusive brands ===
- Porsche Design 9521
- Porsche Design 9522
- Porsche Design 9522 Black Edition

=== Global brands ===
- Hello Kitty Day Edition (Sagem my421z)
- Hello Kitty Night Edition (Sagem my421z)
- Hello Kitty Kawaï
- Roxyphone
- Puma phone
- Oxbow (Sagem my411c)
- Lulu Castagnette (Sagem my411c)
