= Oregon Scientific =

Manufacturer of electronic products

Oregon Scientific, Inc.
- Type: Subsidiary
- Industry: Consumer electronics
- Founded: 1989, Portland, Oregon, United States
- Headquarters: Tualatin, Oregon, United States
- Key people: Michael Prager, President
- Products: Toys, weather stations, cameras, clocks,
- Number of employees: 80 (2006)
- Parent: IDT International
- Website: oregonscientificstore.com

Oregon Scientific, Inc. is a manufacturer of electronics including digital clocks, home weather stations, public alert monitors, fitness devices, toys and globes. The firm was started in 1989 in Portland, Oregon, United States. In 1997, the company became a fully owned subsidiary of IDT (Integrated Display Technology), a Hong Kong–based company.

== Products ==
OSI and its parent company introduced the world's slimmest MP3 player at the time, and the first digital, personal monitor for air quality. The company is known for its WeatherNow weather station built for home use that uses FM radio signals from MSN Direct to provide 4-days of regional weather information. Oregon Scientific made the first stand alone waterproof MP3 player.

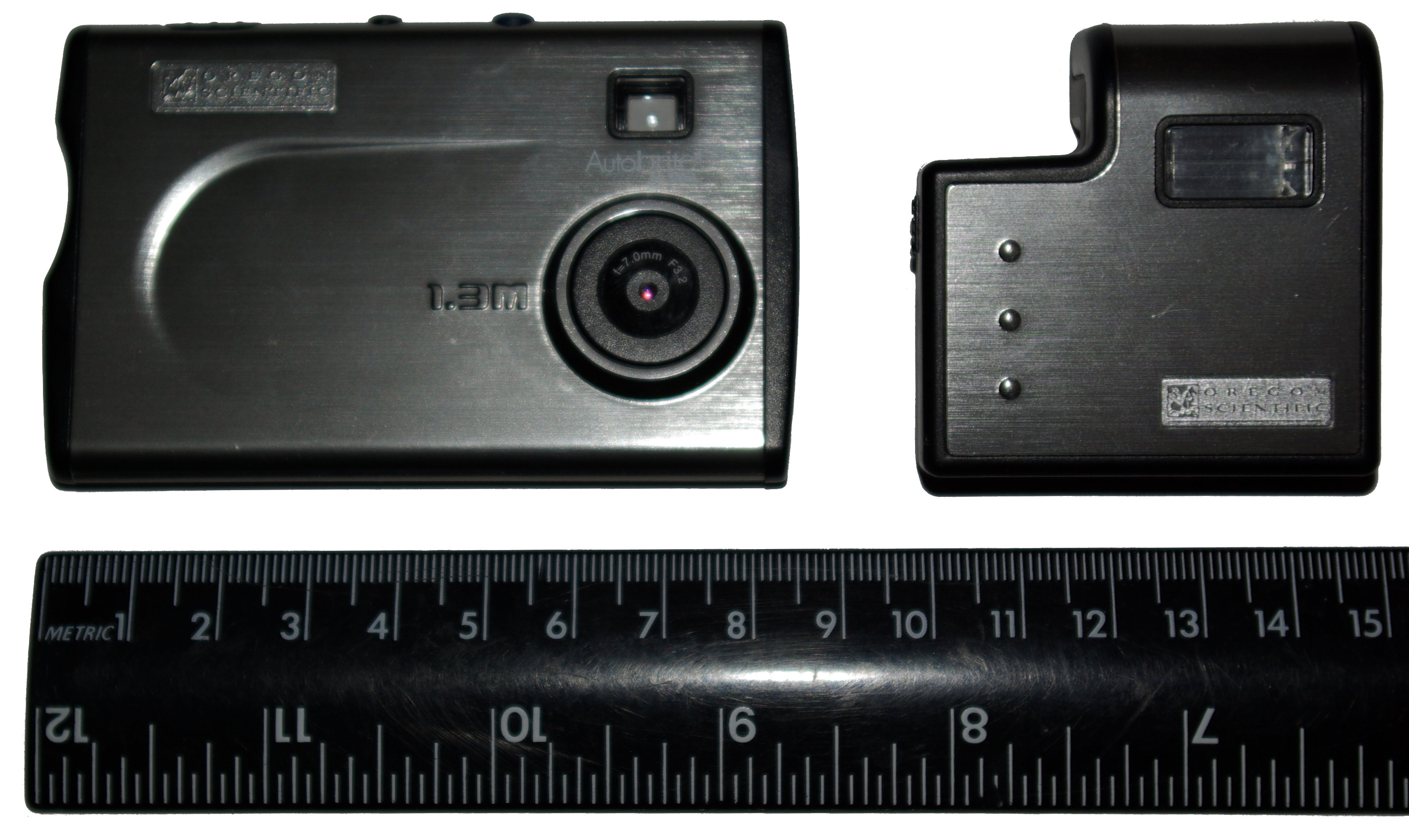
Credit card-sized digital camera, with external flash unit

In 2007, CES Innovations award winners included the ATC2K Waterproof Action Cam, the Talking Wireless BBQ/Oven Thermometer and the WeatherNow II. Their Pendant MP3 Player and Waterproof MP3 player received awards for innovation at the 2005 Consumer Electronics Show. In 2003, OSI partnered with SMaL, Axia and Fujifilm to produce a credit card-sized digital camera. Other products include a waterproof digital video camera, an alarm clock designed by Philippe Starck (a French designer), a pedometer that keeps seven days' worth of data, and an electronic UV monitor among others. The company introduced the Meep! tablet marketed for children in 2012.

== History ==
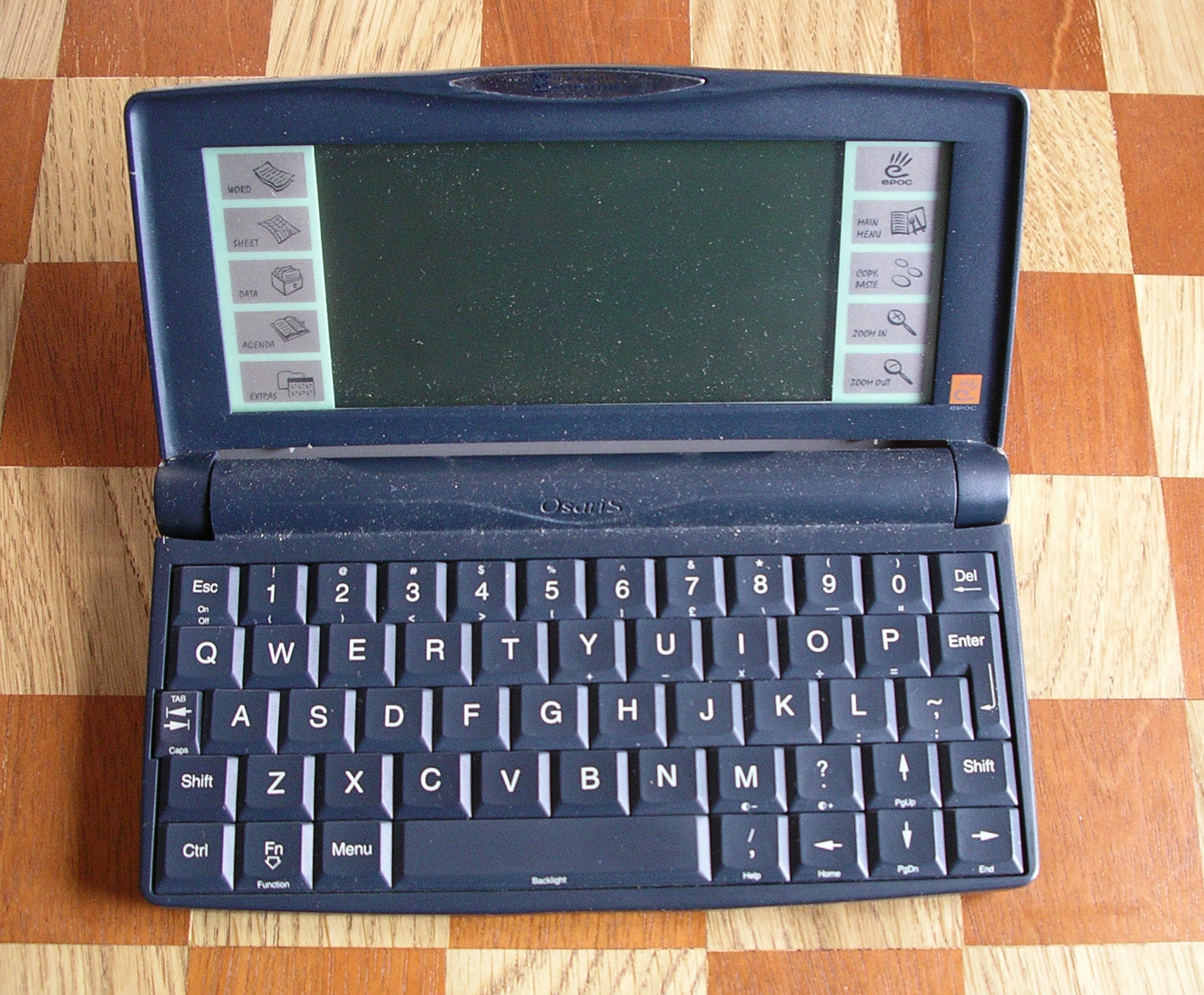
Osaris PDA

In 2000, one of the company's weather radios was recalled for errors in reporting severe weather warnings.

In 2005 to 2006, the company opened its own retail stores with locations in Los Angeles, Palo Alto and Tualatin. These stores round out their retail locations currently in Italy, China, Singapore and Hong Kong. The French subsidiary, Oregon Scientific France SARL, has been liquidated in December 2020. The UK subsidiary, Oregon Scientific (UK) Ltd., has now been struck off by Companies House and confirmed as non trading (7 February 2023) following the difficult trading conditions during the global Covid-19 pandemic and Brexit when the UK left the European Common Market.

In 2021, Oregon Scientific launched a rebranded range of home weather stations moving away from their numbering format to named. These were named after astrometric events in the Solar System: Moon, Venus, Eclipse, Mars etc. These continue to be produced by IDT International and distributed globally through limited channels.

IDT International no longer maintains their website with no updates since 2018 and also financial statements removed. The website also has an expired certificate which would lead us to believe that that their 2021 relaunch failed.
