= MobiWire =

Private Mobile Device Company

- Company type: Private Company
- Industry: Mobile Devices
- Headquarters: Nanterre, France
- Key people: Bruno Mortreux (CEO); David Charlot; Pierre Dupic
- Website: www.mobiwire.com

MobiWire SAS is a spin-off of Sagem Wireless. MobiWire SAS was created in July 2011 with an equity investment from MobiWire Mobiles Ningbo Co LTD, formerly Sagetel Mobiles of Ningbo, China, after Sagem Wireless had gone into bankruptcy when it was majority owned by Sofinnova.

Since then, MobiWire SAS has shifted its focus to mid- to high-range smartphones and cash payment terminals, as an original design manufacturer for main European mobile network operators and retailers. Additional information needed

== History ==
Sagem Mobiles was the original name for MobiWire. It was part of SAGEM, a major French company involved in defense electronics, consumer electronics, and communications systems.

In 2005, SAGEM and SNECMA merged to form SAFRAN.

In 2008, the SAGEM group spun off its communications and mobile telephone businesses (known simply as Sagem Mobiles) to focus on its core business.

The broadband business was called SAGEM Communication. The mobile phone business was called SAGEM Wireless.

Sagem Wireless was launched in January 2009 with investment from Sofinnova, with Thierry Buffenoir as CEO. As an independent company, Sagem Wireless undertook a shift in strategy away from the traditional original design manufacturer space of operator-branded low-range handsets and toward the design, development, and delivery of customized mid- and high-range mobile devices for global lifestyle brands and mobile operators.

In the spring of 2011, Sagem Wireless was renamed Mobiwire SA but went bankrupt soon after.

On July 22, 2011, following recovery proceedings, Sagetel Mobiles made an equity investment and a partial assets transfer relying on the support of the employees and management.

The new company was named MobiWire SAS. As a white-label manufacturer, MobiWire SAS designs and delivers mobile and connected terminals to worldwide operators, brands, and retailers with the support of its factory and R&D, MobiWire Mobiles Ningbo Co Ltd.

== See also ==
- Sagetel
- Sagemcom
