= SAGEM =

French electronics and communication company

Coordinates: 48°50′24″N 2°16′26″E

- Type: Public (Société Anonyme)
- Industry: Telecommunications
- Founded: Paris, France (1924)
- Founder: Marcel Môme
- Defunct: 2005 (first company); 2012 (second company)
- Successor: Safran
- Headquarters: Paris, France
- Key people: Marcel Môme, Robert Labarre, Pierre Faurre, Grégoire Olivier
- Products: Telecommunications service, electronics, communications systems

SAGEM (French: Société d’Applications Générales de l’Électricité et de la Mécanique, translated as "Company of General Applications of Electricity and Mechanics") was a French company involved in defence electronics, consumer electronics, and communication systems.

Founded in 1924, SAGEM initially specialised in mechanical engineering and tool manufacture. Early in its existence, it entered the defense sector. The company made a foray into telecommunications in 1942 with the first telex printer, although it was principally a defense-oriented company during the first few decades of the post-war era. This majority focus upon the military sector continued for several years after the departure of Marcel Môme, SAGEM's founder.

During the 1980s, SAGEM distributed Japanese fax machines while developing its own technology. Over the traditional defence sector, such products accounted for a growing share of SAGEM's revenues. During the 1990s, the firm entered the automotive systems sector. Starting in 1995, the company produced GSM telephones for the French market, at one point holding roughly 50% of it. Early development internationally with a focus in Europe Asia and Middle East.

By the turn of the century, SAGEM's net profits neared the FF 1 billion mark during 1999. In 2005, SAGEM and SNECMA merged to form Safran. Together, the companies focus mainly on aeronautics, defense, and security. The communications and mobile telephony businesses were spun off as two independent entities: Sagemcom and MobiWire.

== History ==
=== Early years ===
In 1924, 25-year-old French businessman Marcel Môme founded the Société d’Applications Générales de l’Électricité et de la Mécanique (SAGEM). Môme would be a key figure for the business in its first four decades, and remained at the head of the company until 1962. Based in Paris, SAGEM specialized in mechanical engineering. Early products included electrical components, power distribution equipment, cameras, projectors, and other equipment. A key early customer of SAGEM was the French tyre manufacturer Michelin, for whom the company produced numerous tools and other equipment. The firm also chose to market its products to the defense industry.

In 1942, following a request from the French Ministry of Telecommunications, SAGEM developed a new communication system, the telex printer. This product marked the company's move toward a larger involvement in the telecommunications sector. After the Second World War, the company became increasingly involved in France's defense and aeronautical industries. In 1961, SAGEM was selected to provide the inertial navigation systems for France's first ballistic missiles, as well as the optical and navigation systems for the first ballistic missile submarines. The company maintained its focus on the defense industry even after the retirement of Môme. Robert Labarre took over the leadership role from Môme as SAGEM's second president, remaining in this role until 1987.

Although primarily a defence contractor in the post-war era, SAGEM also developed telecommunications products, including a range of telex machines and becoming the world's number two manufacturer in the category. SAGEM's management emphasised the importance of research and development, enabling it to capture a leading role in communications technology during the early 1980s, when it released the next generation of screen-based telex machines.

=== Growth in telecommunications ===
Its focus on research helped SAGEM respond to the arrival of fax machines, which originated in Japan and brought an abrupt end to the monopoly of the costly telex machine. Rather than responding with the costly development of its own product to challenge this new technology, while eager to maintain its prominent position in the telecommunications sector, SAGEM adopted another approach by negotiating a distribution agreement with Japanese electronics business Murata. Under this deal, SAGEM marketed several of Murata's fax machines in Europe, and adapted these machines to the requirements of the European market. It used the distribution arrangement to assist development of SAGEM's own fax machine technology and subsequently entered the market with its own products.

During 1985, Robert Labarre was in the process of transferring control of SAGEM to Pierre Faurre following a management buyout. Seeing the potential of the telecommunications sector, Faurre reshaped SAGEM into one of Europe's leading high-technology specialists. This shift was motivated by declining defence budgets across Europe and the disintegration of the Soviet Union, making involvement in the defence sector less attractive. During the late 1980s, the firm released several innovations in the fax machine market, including the first machine capable of printing on standard paper (instead of expensive thermal paper) and the first home consumer units. During this era, SAGEM experienced rising sales, topping the FFr 10 billion mark in 1990. Communications products comprised a growing share of the company's revenues over the defense sector.

Throughout the 1990s, the telecommunications sector continued to expand, seeing rapid advances in mobile telephony, the arrival of digital television technologies and the emergence of the early 'net-economy. SAGEM, who had developed a reputation as a successful high-tech manufacturer with a broad range of electronics and communications products was positioned to exploit this climate. In the mid-1990s, the firm adapting its technology to automotive control systems and other vehicle subsystems, quickly becoming a major European automobile electronics supplier. Other product lines SAGEM went into in this period included television sets, credit card readers and digital set-top boxes.

Starting in 1997, sales of mobile phones grew enormously. SAGEM rapidly became one of the world's leading manufacturers of GSM telephones, as well as the leader of the French market, at one point holding roughly 50% of the market. This sector's growth was combined with other gains, including returns on its investment in Internet technologies. In 1999, SAGEM's revenue increased by more than 19% over the previous year's, exceeding FFr 22.3 billion. The firm was highly profitable, seeing net profits nearing the FFr 1 billion mark.

The defence electronics branch of SAGEM remained active during this time, despite its declining prominence in the group. Several deals to overhaul and upgrade aerospace assets were secured during this period. In June 1996, SAGEM was selected to upgrade the electronic systems of some France-built Mirage aircraft of the Pakistan Air Force, under the ROSE upgrade (Retrofit of Strike Element) program. Maintaining an interest in unmanned aerial vehicles (UAVs), the company struck deals with Dassault Aviation and General Electric.

=== 21st century ===
SAGEM grouped its business around two activities:

- A communication branch (SAGEM was ranked second among French telecommunication equipment providers);
- A defense and security branch (Sagem Défense Sécurité), which covered three domains:
  - Optronics and defense (imagers, infrared and light-intensifying cameras, sights, periscopes, gyrostabilized pods, cryptology, UAV systems, etc.);
  - Avionics (inertial navigation, civilian and military avionics, guidance and pointing systems);
  - Electronics (electronics, software, circuit boards, control units).

In 2005, SAGEM and SNECMA merged to form Safran. In 2007, SAGEM launched its mobile phones into the Indian market, marketed under the trade name "Bleu".

In 2008, the SAGEM group spun off its communications and mobile telephony businesses (Sagem Mobile) to focus on core company values. Sagem Sécurité merged with Ingenico. The broadband business became Sagemcom. The mobile phone business became Sagem Wireless. The identity, bio-metric and transaction business became Safran Morpho. The company's defence electronics business became Safran Sagem.

== Products ==
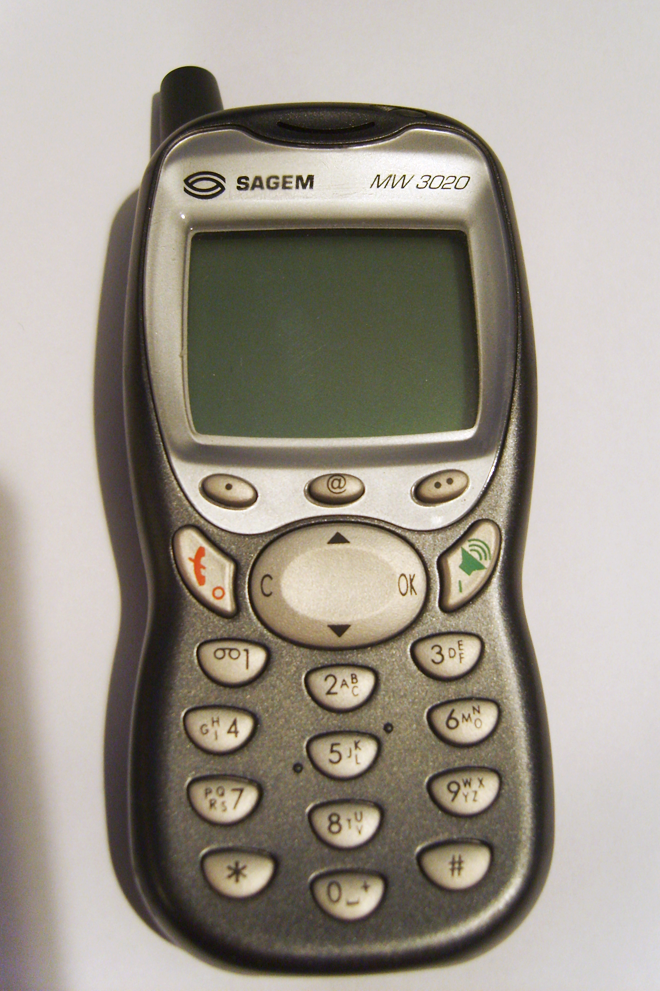
Sagem MW3020 mobile phone

- Dassault-Sagem SlowFast
- SAGEM Crecerelle
- CU161 Sperwer Tactical UAV system
- Inertial Unit Sigma 30
- Safran Patroller UAV

=== Mobile phones ===
==== 9xx series ====
- M9500
- COCACOLA (mc 922)
- DC 918
- MC 912
- MC 919
- MC 920
- MC 922 FM
- MC 926
- MC 929
- MC 929 FM
- MC 930
- MC 932
- MC 939
- MC 940
- MC 949
- MC 959 ID
- MC 959R
- MC916
- MC919
- MC932
- MC959
- MC968
- MC986
- MW930
- MW932
- MW9500
- MW963E
- PW 959
- RC 920
- RC 922
- RC 926
- RENAULT (mc 922)
- RC 930

==== my100Phone series ====
- Sagem my100X
- Sagem my101X
- Sagem my150X

==== my200Phone series ====
- Sagem my200C
- Sagem my200X
- Sagem my201X
- Sagem my202C
- Sagem my202X
- Sagem my210X
- Sagem my212X
- Sagem my214X
- Sagem my215X
- Sagem my220X
- Sagem my226X
- Sagem my230X
- Sagem my231X
- Sagem my234X

==== my300Phone series ====
- Sagem my300C
- Sagem my300X
- Sagem my301X
- Sagem my302X
- Sagem my303X
- Sagem my310X
- Sagem my312X

==== my400Phone series ====
- Sagem my400V
- Sagem my400X
- Sagem my401C
- Sagem my401Ci
- Sagem my401V
- Sagem my401X
- Sagem my401Z
- Sagem my405X
- Sagem my411c
- Sagem my411v
- Sagem my411x
- Sagem my419x
- Sagem my421z
- Sagem my421x
- Sagem my429x

==== my500Phone series ====
- Sagem my500X
- Sagem my501c
- Sagem my501h
- Sagem my511X
- Sagem my519x
- Sagem my521x

==== my600Phone series ====
- Sagem my600X
- Sagem my600V

==== my700Phone series ====
- Sagem my700X
- Sagem my721x
- Sagem my721z
- Sagem my730c
- Sagem my750x
- Sagem my750+

==== my800Phone series ====
- Sagem my800X
- Sagem my810x
- Sagem my850C
- Sagem my855c

==== my900Phone series ====
- Sagem my900C
- Sagem my901C

==== Other MY models ====
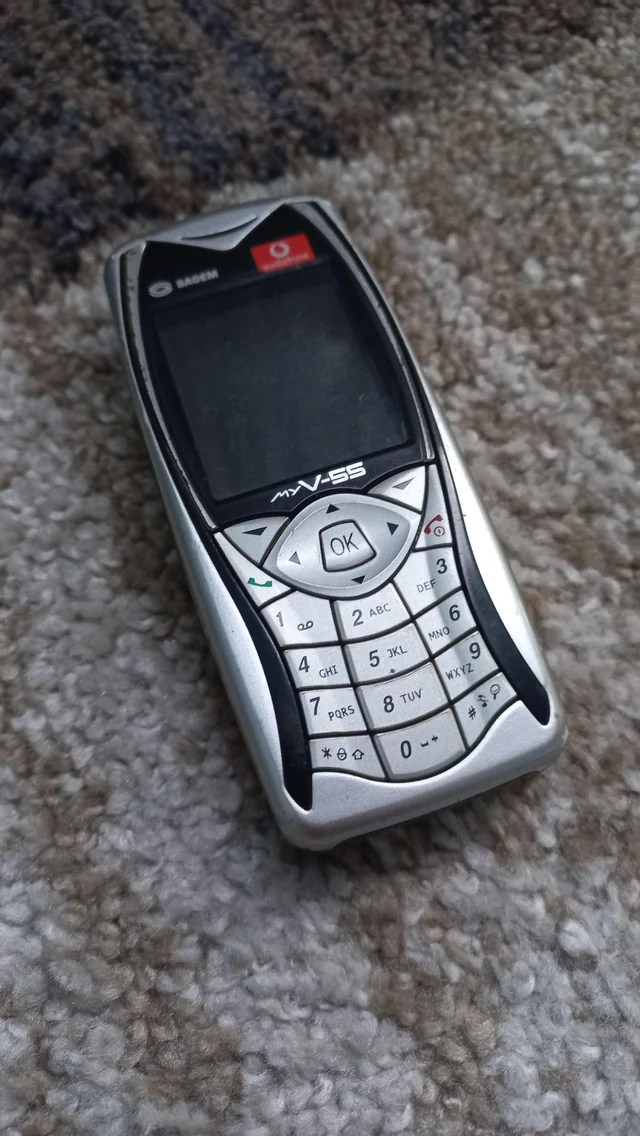
Sagem myV-55 mobile phone

- Sagem myC2-3
- Sagem myC3-2
- SAGEM MyC4-2
- Sagem myC5-2
- Sagem myC5-3
- Sagem myZ-5
- Sagem myW-7
- Sagem myV-55
- Sagem myV-56
- Sagem myV-65
- Sagem myV-76
- Sagem myZ-55
- Sagem myX-1 Trio
- Sagem myX1-2
- Sagem myX2-2
- Sagem myX3-2
- Sagem myX-4
- Sagem myX5-2
- Sagem myX6-2
- Sagem myX-7
- Sagem myX-8
- Sagem myMobileTV
- Sagem my Xt
- Sagem myS-7
