= Portable audio player =

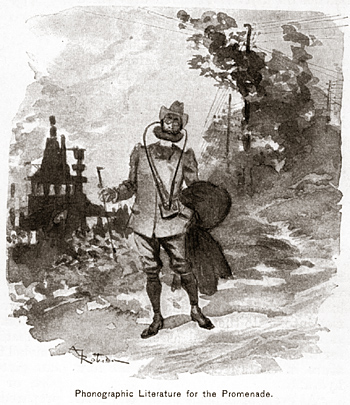
A personal mono device as science fiction (Albert Robida, 1894)

A portable audio player is a personal mobile device that allows the user to listen to recorded audio while mobile. Sometimes a distinction is made between a portable player, battery-powered and with one or more small loudspeakers, and a personal player, listened to with earphones.

== History ==
Portable battery-operated reel-to-reel tape recorders were introduced in the 1950s, initially tending to be high-priced units for reporters, produced by Uher and Nagra. Lower-priced units became available later. In the mid-1960s Philips introduced the battery-operated compact cassette recorder, originally used for recording speech. At about the same time the 8-track player was introduced. It was very successful at the time, though bulky and inconvenient to use. There was a pause at the end of each track as the program changed. The compact cassette, although physically much smaller than the 8-track cartridge, became capable of good sound quality as the technology developed, and longer cassette tapes became available. Cassette decks (not portable) were introduced for home use, and this encouraged the production of pre-recorded music cassettes.

== Personal stereo ==
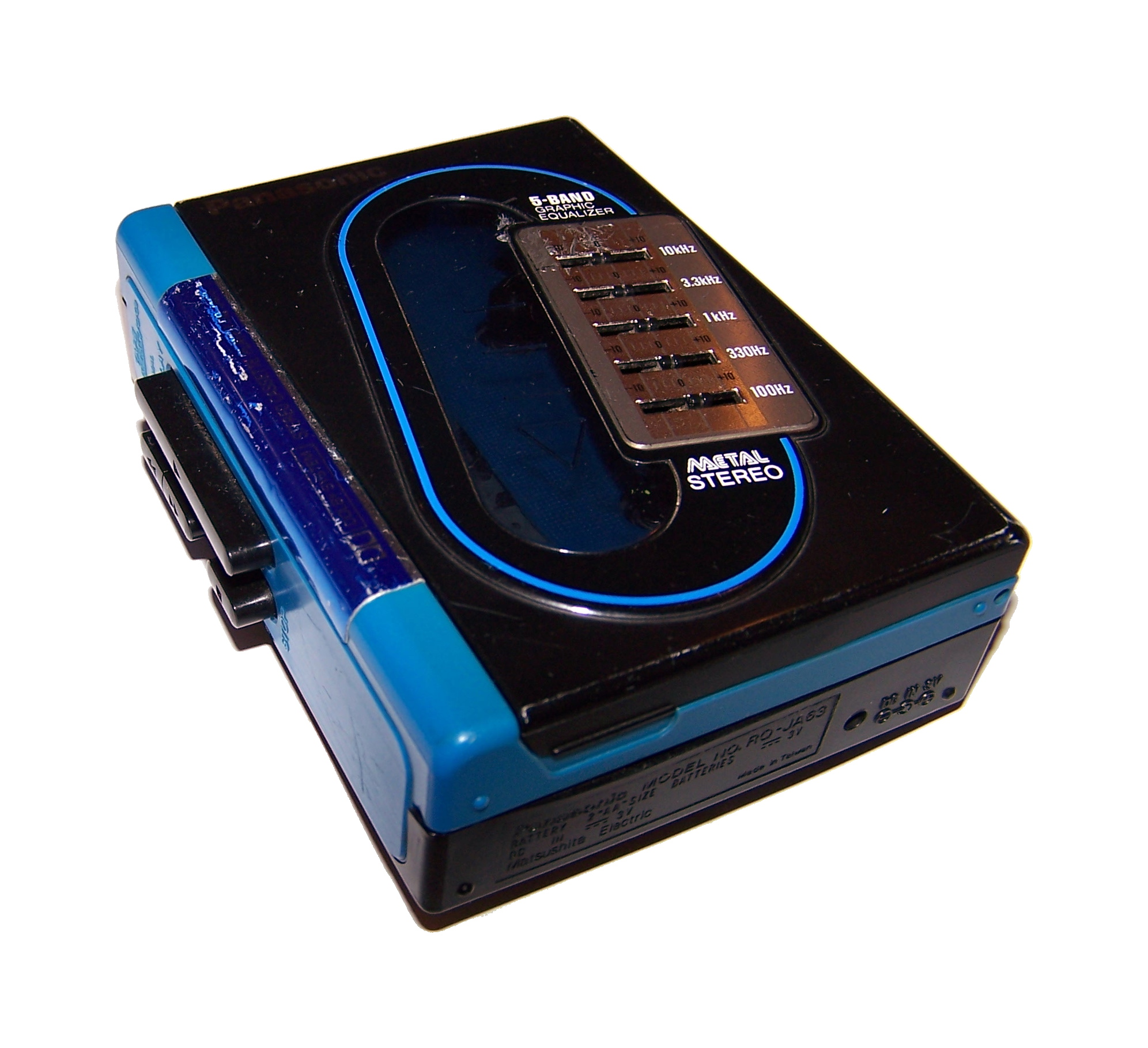
Panasonic Stereo Cassette Player RQ-JA63

The first portable audio player available to the general public, the Sony Walkman, was introduced in 1979 and sold very well. It was much smaller than an 8-track player or the earlier cassette recorders, and was listened to with stereophonic headphones, unlike previous equipment which used small loudspeakers. Unlike small loudspeakers, headphones were capable of very good sound quality. All previous compact cassette devices could record as well as play back; Walkmans and similar devices often had no recording facility, but took advantage of the pre-recorded cassettes that had become widely available.

== Disk players ==
Early personal CD players can play commercial CDs; later models can play recordable CD-R and CDRW media either copied from a pressed CD or containing MP3 and similar files.

== Media players ==
In 1998, digital audio players (DAPs) based on flash memory or hard disk storage became available (The Rio PMP300 from Diamond Multimedia is widely considered to be the first mass market DAP). Files are usually compressed using lossy compression; this reduces file size at the cost of some loss of quality. The trade-off between degree of compression and file size can be varied, although this is not an option for existing compressed files. The advantage of solid-state DAPs over hard disks and CDs is resistance to vibration, small size and weight, and low battery usage. Early solid-state DAPs had capacities of a few tens of kilobytes; as of 2009 capacities of many gigabytes are available.

== See also ==
- Waterproof audio player
