= Millet (manufacturer) =

French outdoor sports equipment company

- Type: Subsidiary, private
- Industry: Textile
- Founded: 1930; 96 years ago in France
- Headquarters: Annecy-le-Vieux, France
- Products: Apparel, Backpacks, Gear
- Parent: Lafuma
- Website: www.millet-mountain.com

Millet Mountain Group is a French-based company, headquartered in Annecy, specializing in outdoor equipment such as backpacks and sleeping bags. In 2014, Millet was acquired by Swiss holding Calida group. In January 2022, Calida agreed to sell Millet to Jean-Pierre Millet, grandson of Millet's founder, and Inspiring Sport Capital (ISC), a private equity company dedicated to the sports industry. Completion of the transaction is expected in the second quarter of 2022.

Millet also offers a wide variety of other equipment, earning comparisons to United States–based companies such as Timberland and Columbia Sportswear.

Millet is not related to Millets, a UK chain of shops selling outdoor clothing.

== Controversy in Belgium ==
During the mid-eighties, people wearing colorful shiny nylon down filled winter jackets from Millet felt as if they were imitators of the figurine Bibendum. This phenomenon was very noticeable in Belgium. In 1986 Flemish journalist Paul Jambers made a report for the Flemish TV that highlighted the popularity of the expensive Millet down jackets amongst well-to-do logo-obsessed teenagers in Antwerp schools and the exclusionary social practices that went along with it. The report had extremely high ratings, led to a nationwide controversy and to the downfall of the Millet down jacket as a status symbol.

== Brands ==
In spring 2019, the Millet Mountain Group comprised three historic outdoor and sportswear brands: Millet, a technical brand focused on alpine products; Lafuma, an accessible urban travel brand offering footwear, clothing, accessories, and functional backpacks; and Eider, a protective brand intended for skiing and urban use. The group was part of the Swiss Calida Group, which later found a buyer for the Millet Mountain Group.
