= OEMServices =

French aircraft maintenance, repair, overhaul and supply chain joint-venture

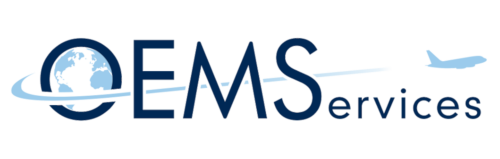
- Type: Joint venture
- Industry: Aerospace, MRO, Logistics & Supply Chain
- Founded: 2009; 17 years ago
- Headquarters: Tremblay-en-France, France
- Key people: Didier Granger (CEO Worldwide); Pierre Seon (General Manager Middle East); Andrés Duque (CEO Americas); Ken NG (CEO Singapore)
- Services: Aircraft maintenance, AOG Desk Support Reliability & Performance Monitoring, Inventory & Pool Access, Predictive Maintenance
- Owner: Safran (25%); Thales (25%); Diehl (25%); Liebherr (25%)
- Number of employees: 200-500
- Subsidiaries: OEMServices Americas; OEMServices Asia
- Website: oemservices.aero

OEMServices SAS (formerly SAVE GIE), or OEMS for short, is a French company involved in the maintenance, repair, overhaul, logistics and customer support of commercial aircraft. It is a joint venture between aerospace giants Safran, Thales, Diehl and Liebherr, acting as their AOG and MRO subsidiary for Aircraft Component Maintenance and spillover support.The company was established in 2009 with Zodiac Aerospace, Thales Group, Diehl Aerospace and Liebherr Aerospace each owning 25%. Zodiac Aerospace was purchased outright by Safran in 2018. The purchase of Zodiac Aerospace by the Safran Group made OEMServices part of the new Safran conglomerate.

== Services and clients ==
OEMServices, being the Maintenance, Repair & Overhaul front office for its 4 Parent Companies, is considered a services provider. Its primary service is concentrated in the aircraft maintenance, AOG Desk Support Reliability & Performance Monitoring, as well as the Inventory & Pool Access sub-categories of the aviation industry.

As a direct competitor of Lufthansa's MRO Subsidiary, Lufthansa Technik, Airbus FHS, and Air France-KLM's Engineering & MRO branch, OEMServices offers airlines maintenance on Repair-by-the-Hour, Time & Material and Flat Rate basis. It has exclusive contracts with both legacy carriers and low-cost carriers.

Some of OEMServices' fleets on an exclusive basis include:

- Air Senegal
- Air Serbia
- Asiana
- BeOnd
- Egyptair
- Emirates
- Ethiopian Airlines
- Etihad
- Japan Airlines
- Nouvelair
- Play
- Singapore Airlines
- Starlux Airlines

Apart from having contracts with different airlines for the subcontracting of their component maintenance support, OEMServices also provides maintenance under general terms & conditions.

Since 2020, OEMServices also provides a tax representation offer to various international OEM, supporting them in their expansion into France and Europe.

As of 2021, OEMServices has an ongoing development of its predictive maintenance capabilities.

== Location ==
OEMServices is as of 2022 capable of providing worldwide services. While growing in France, transferring its operations from Orly Airport to Paris Roissy CDG, OEMServices has also established subsidiairies overseas, having set up capabilities in Piscataway (NJ) then in Atlanta (GA) in 2017, in Singapore in 2019 and an office in Dubai via its parent company Liebherr. As of 2021, OEMServices has set up facilities in Shanghai, China.

== Media appearance ==
In 2019, OEMServices was awarded at the Trophées PME RMC, 10th edition, a recognized French prize honoring the ambition and innovation of its business.
