= Dave Kalama =

American surfer

Personal information
- Born: Newport Beach, California, U.S.
- Height: 5 ft 11 in (180 cm)
- Weight: 195
- Website: www.davidkalama.com

Surfing career
- Sport: Surfing
- Sponsors: QuickBlade, Kaenon, Easy Rider, Kalama Kamps
- Major achievements: Windsurfing World Championships: 1991 Hard Rock World Cup of Windsurfing/Ho'okipa Winner, 2010 Rainbow Sandals Molokai 2 Oahu Paddleboard World Championships SUP Winner, Naish Maliko 2010 14’ Winner, 2011 Maui Naish International Paddleboard Championship (Maliko) Winner, 2011 SUP Awards "Top Male Paddler" Finalist.

Surfing specifications
- Stance: Regular (natural foot)
- Shaper: Dave Kalama
- Quiver: SUP surf boards, SUP downwind boards, SUP race boards, tow-in surfboards, surfboards, foil boards, windsurfs, OC-1, OC-4.
- Favorite waves: Jaws (beach)
- Favorite maneuvers: Tow-in surfing

Dave Kalama is a big wave surfer/tow-in surfer, stand-up paddle (SUP) surfer and racer, surf and SUP board shaper, windsurfer, outrigger canoe racer, private adventure guide, and celebrity watersports enthusiast. Kalama, his wife, 2 sons and 1 daughter live in Kula, Maui.

Kalama is credited with the co-development of the big wave surfing technique of tow-in surfing, along with Laird Hamilton, Darrick Doerner, and Buzzy Kerbox. Recently, Kalama together with close friend Laird Hamilton have been actively promoting and mastering an ancient Hawaiian mode of water transportation and watersport called SUP, "stand-up paddling", and he has begun a series of increasingly longer solo paddle events between various Hawaiian islands. Kalama and Hamilton are also credited with the co-development of "foil surfing" (hydrofoil surfing).

Kalama is a descendant from a long line of noteworthy Hawaiian watermen; his grandfather brought outrigger canoe paddling to the mainland U.S., and his father Ilima Kalama was the 1962 world-champion surfer and a lifelong outrigger canoe paddler. Kalama is known socially amongst surfers as placing a high respect on local and community surf etiquette.

Kalama is a part-time coach to SUP competitors Kai Lenny (2010 and 2011 SUP Surf World Champion) and Slater Trout.

As a high school age athlete, Kalama was a competitive ski racer and high school football player in the winter sports resort town of Mammoth Lakes, California.

In July 2006, Kalama and BamMan Productions business partner Laird Hamilton were jointly awarded the Beacon Award at the Maui Film Festival for "helping to revive the surf film genre."

== Kalama and Laird Hamilton ==
Kalama and fellow celebrity surfing pal Laird Hamilton have been featured in big wave riding films and photographs while riding the largest ocean waves in recorded history. For survival, they surf together and only with other wave riders they absolutely trust (critical life-saving rescues from the tow-in watercraft are commonplace—they take turns piloting the craft—trust is paramount). Their preference is the tow-in surfing method (which they co-invented), which affords them the ability to catch the largest (and fastest) of ocean waves; their preferred location is the reef at Pe'ahi (pronounced pay-ah-hee) (commonly called "Jaws") on the northcentral coast of the Island of Maui (known for holding and breaking the largest waves on the planet); and their preferred riding style is "radical, late take-offs, forceful sweeping drops and turns across the face of 60+ footer waves, exiting over the shoulder of the wave at the end of the ride (to catch a tow ride back outside for another ride, of course)". Their extreme wave rides, chronicled in film and photographs, are daredevil conquests that do not seem possible (or wise!). They have survived near-death experiences in major "wipe-outs" under mountains of falling water.

== Film appearances ==
Kalama appeared in the opening sequence of the James Bond film Die Another Day.

In October 2006, Kalama, along with friend and celebrity waterman, Laird Hamilton, biked and paddled the entire Hawaiian Island chain—more than 450 miles—in a week. The feat was featured on Don King's film Beautiful Son in support of autistic people.

Kalama won an award for his role in Riding Giants.

Kalama has also appeared in The Endless Summer II and Step Into Liquid.
