= Anneyron =

- Commune
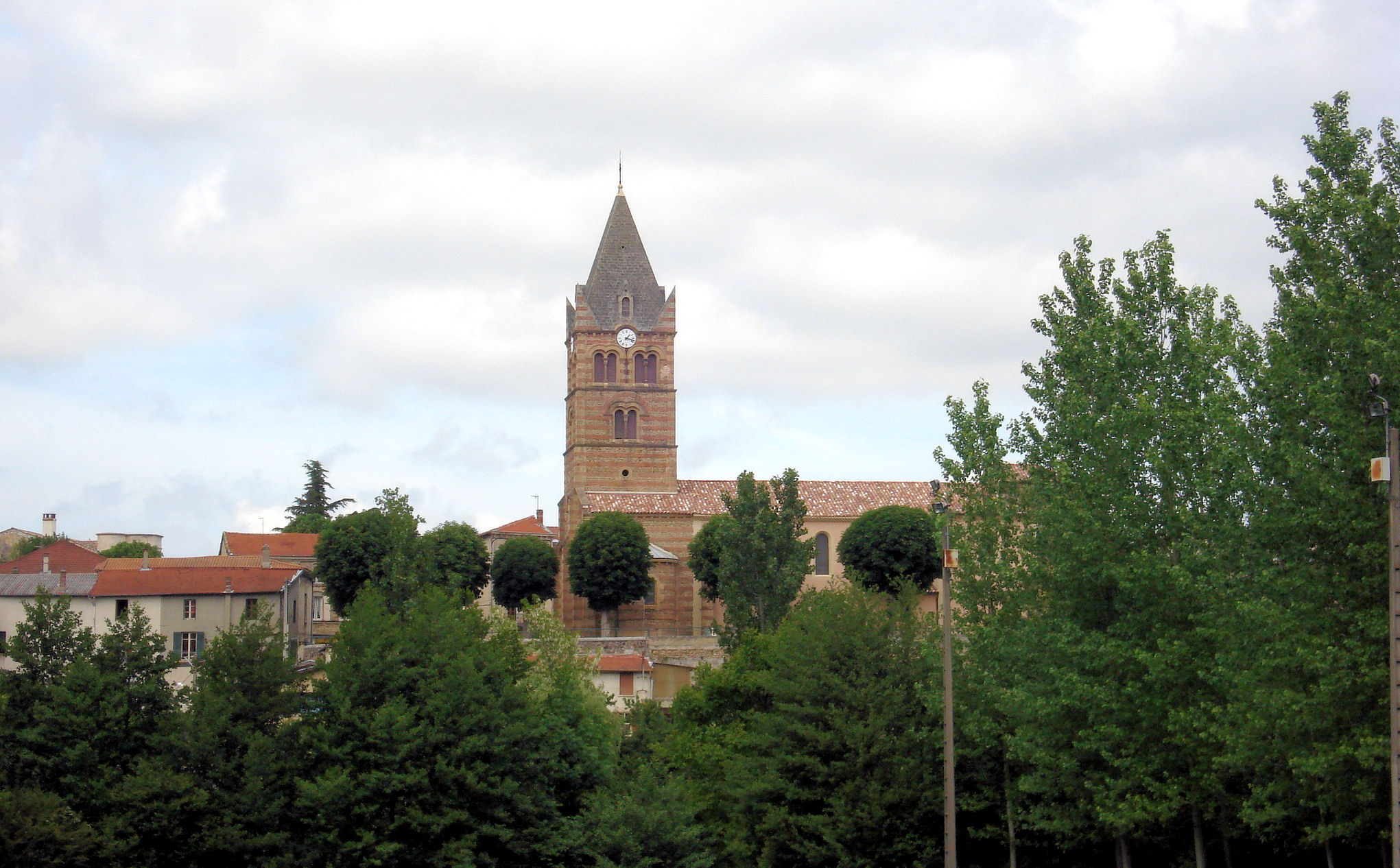
- The church of Anneyron

- Coat of arms
- Location of Anneyron
- Location within France Location within Auvergne-Rhône-Alpes
- Coordinates: 45°16′19″N 4°53′19″E
- Country: France
- Region: Auvergne-Rhône-Alpes
- Department: Drôme
- Arrondissement: Valence
- Canton: Saint-Vallier

Government
  - Mayor (2020–2026): Patricia Boidin
- Area^{1}: 36.23 km^{2} (13.99 sq mi)
- Elevation: 210 m (690 ft)
- Highest elevation: 372 m (1,220 ft)
- Lowest elevation: 165 m (541 ft)
- Population (2023): 4,169
  - Density: 115.1/km^{2} (298.0/sq mi)
- Time zone: UTC+01:00 (CET)
  - Summer (DST): UTC+02:00 (CEST)
- INSEE/Postal code: 26010 /26140
- ^{1} French Land Register data, which excludes lakes, ponds, glaciers > 1 km^{2} (0.386 sq mi or 247 acres) and river estuaries.

Anneyron (French pronunciation: [aneʁɔ̃]) is a commune in the Drôme department in southeastern France.

== Population ==
Historical population

Year	Pop.	±% p.a.
1821	2,082	—
1841	2,891	+1.65%
1861	3,122	+0.39%
1881	2,869	−0.42%
1901	2,600	−0.49%
1921	2,311	−0.59%
1931	2,248	−0.28%
1946	2,324	+0.22%
1962	2,519	+0.50%

Year	Pop.	±% p.a.
1968	2,746	+1.45%
1975	2,895	+0.76%
1982	2,864	−0.15%
1990	3,038	+0.74%
1999	3,319	+0.99%
2007	3,727	+1.46%
2012	3,863	+0.72%
2017	3,999	+0.69%
2023	4,169	+0.70%

Source: EHESS and INSEE (1968–2023)

== See also ==
- Communes of the Drôme department
