= Sagem myX-2 =

Telephone

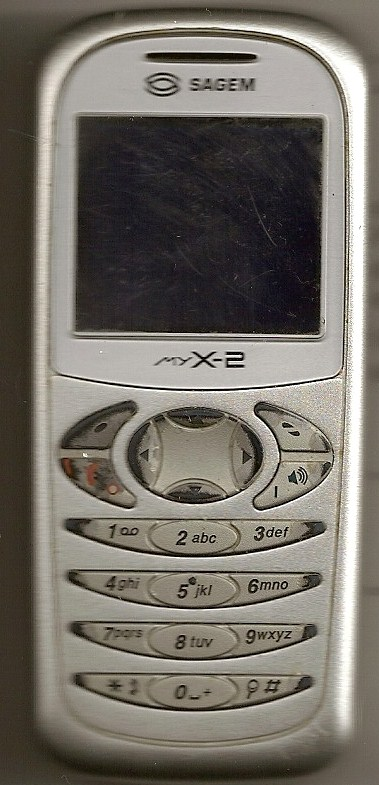
- Compatible networks: GSM 900/1800
- Dimensions: 19×98×42 mm (0.75×3.86×1.65 in)
- Display: STN 256 colours

The Sagem myX-2 is a small and lightweight phone, with other similar models such as the myX-3, myX-8 and myC-2. It was manufactured by SAGEM Communication. It was introduced in 2003 and is now discontinued.

== Features and specifications ==
=== Dimensions ===
- Depth-top: 19 mm
- Depth-bottom: 15 mm
- Length: 98 mm - 100 mm
- Width: 42 mm

=== Battery ===
- Battery Life: 340 hours
- Battery Voltage: 3.77 V
- Charging Time: 1hr 30 min to 2h

=== Other ===
- WAP Enabled: Yes
- WAP Speed: 48.3 kbit/s
- Pin Codes: 2
- Loading Time: 5 seconds (approx.)

=== Usability ===
- Screen Depth: 256 colors
- Animated Menu: Yes
- Menu Style: Scroll up images
- Signal Range: Good/average
- Aerial Hidden: Yes

=== Useful features ===
The Sagem has a useful WAP feature, which although slow, can be an emergency measure.

The myX-2 does not have a camera feature.

The Sagem also has a game with 4 options.

==== Games ====
- Sweetheart: a picture puzzle where you have to bring a couple together which are separated by hearts and squares.
- Picture Puzzle 9 pieces: A nine-piece picture puzzle, easy difficulty
- Picture Puzzle 16 pieces: A sixteen-piece picture puzzle, medium difficulty
- Picture Puzzle 25 pieces: Hardest of the 3 picture puzzles, 25 pieces.

All 4 games have a high score record stored on the phone.

== Special features ==
The Sagem myX-2 has a few special features such as a calculator and currency converter. It also has a hidden menu.

=== Hidden menu ===
Accessed by pressing '*' while in the menu, this hidden menu will show battery voltage, application versions, test the LCD and allows you to lock the SIM, using 'SIM Lock' (requires password).

==== LCD tester ====
- Red Screen: Simply makes the screen red to test it.
- Green Screen: Simply makes the screen green to test it.
- Blue Screen: Simply makes the screen blue to test it.
- Photo: Displays all the colours the screen/phone can handle it one image, on a grid.
- Vibrate: Vibrates the phone to see the reaction from the screen.

==== Sim lock ====
Simply locks the sim card, requires a password. 35227500345365-3

==== Application ====
- Battery Status: Displays the current battery output in volts (V)
- Version: Displays Version Info

==== PROM ====
Displays the IMEI info.

=== Calculator ===
Accessed easily from the Accessories menu, this feature can be useful if you don't have a calculator to hand. It includes the basic add, subtract, divide, multiply.

=== Currency converter ===
No, not a live feed, but a useful converter when on the move. You can set the current rate and currency name.

== See also ==
- Mobile phone
