= Gabrielle Reece =

American volleyball player (born 1970)

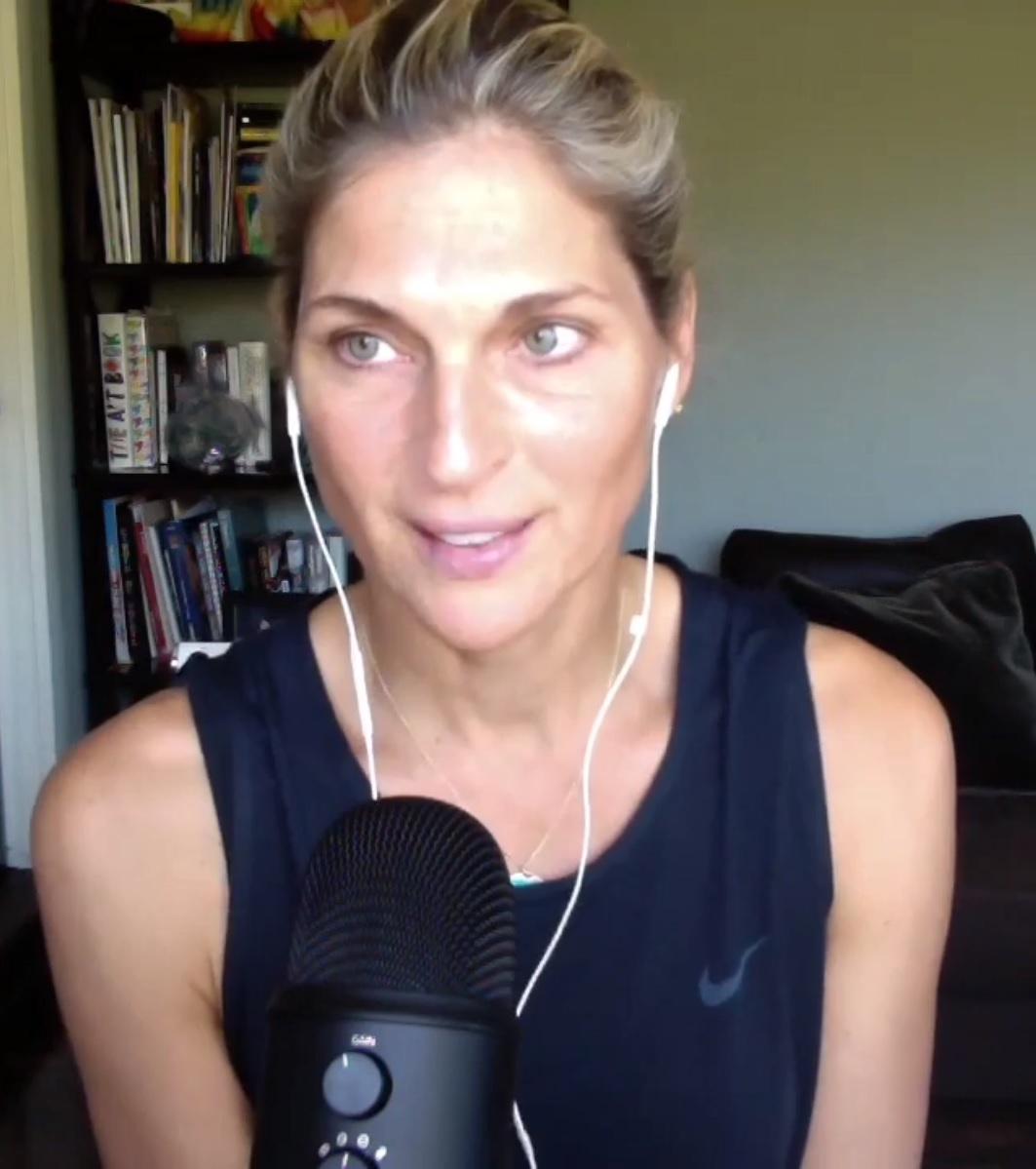
- Reece in 2017

Personal information
- Born: January 6, 1970 (age 56) La Jolla, California, US
- Education: Florida State University
- Height: 6 ft 3 in (1.90 m)
Beach volleyball information
- Years: Teammate
- –: Holly McPeak, Linda Hanley

Gabrielle Allyse Reece (born January 6, 1970) is an American former professional volleyball player, sports announcer, TV show host, and podcast host.

== Early life ==
Reece was raised in Saint Thomas, U.S. Virgin Islands, an only child of Terry Glynn and Robert Eduardo Reece. Her father, who was Trinidadian, was killed in a plane crash when Gabrielle was five. From the ages of 2-7 Reece lived with her mother's family friends in Long Island New York. She returned to the U.S. mainland for the eleventh grade, attending Keswick Christian School in St. Petersburg, Florida, when she took up sports. In 1989, she moved to New York City to more rigorously pursue a parallel career as a sports fashion model and also continue her pro volleyball career. Reece is also a graduate of Florida State University.

== Volleyball career ==
After graduation, Reece played on professional volleyball tours for several years.

Reece trained in golf for four years hoping to make it onto the LPGA. However, she was unsuccessful. In 2009, she said, "... with young children, I simply didn't have the time for such a demanding game".

== Other work ==
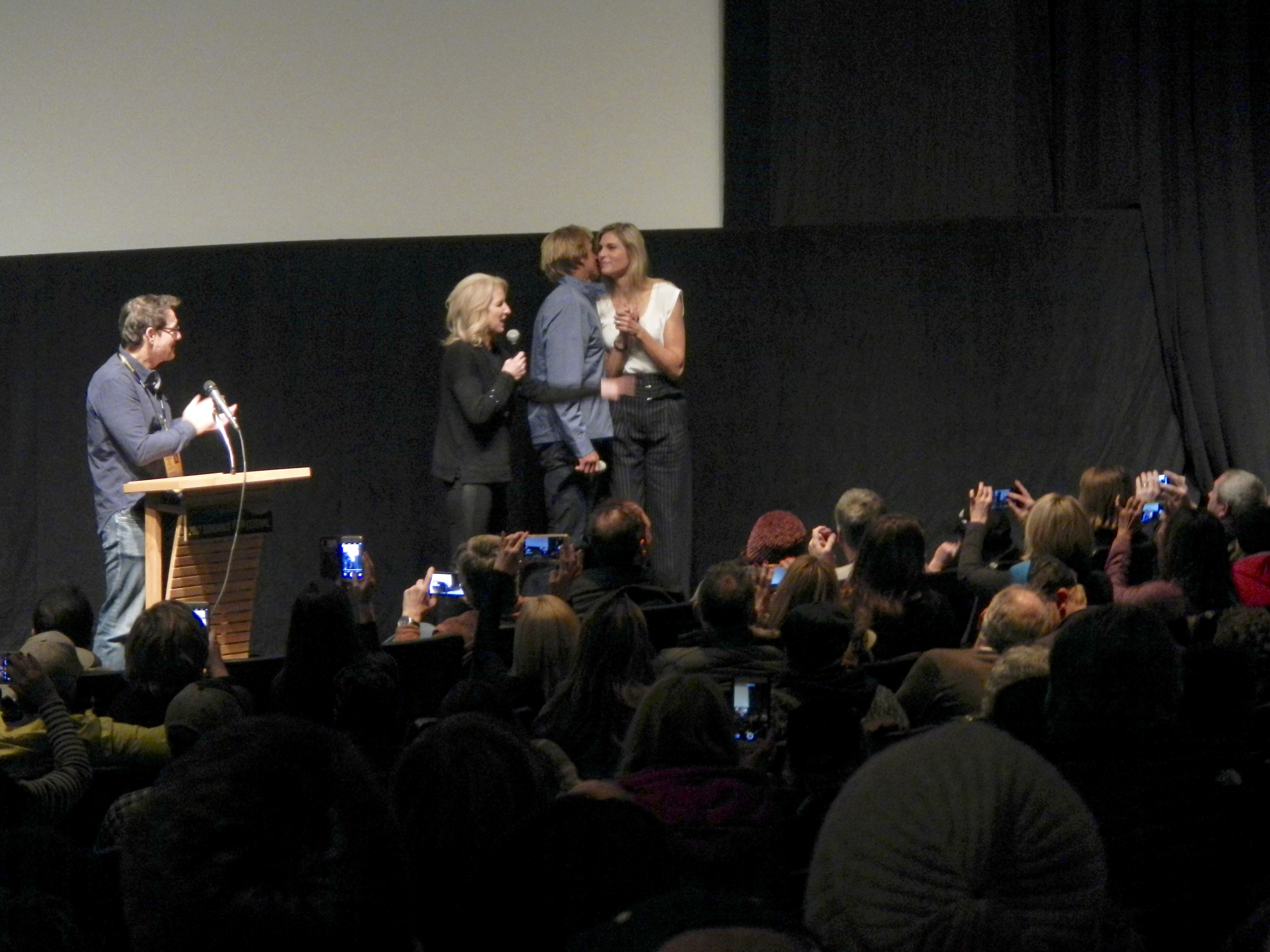
David Courier, Rory Kennedy, Laird Hamilton and Gabrielle Reece at the Sundance, Park City, Utah in 2017.

Reece appeared in several Elle and Harper's Bazaar layouts in the late 1980s and early 1990s. She has appeared on the covers of Outside, Shape, Women's Sports & Fitness, Playboy, Elle, and Life.

In the mid-'90s, she hosted the extreme sports-reality TV series "The Extremists" from season 3 onward.

In her April 2013 book titled My Foot Is Too Big for the Glass Slipper: A Guide to the Less Than Perfect Life, Reece writes that "to truly be feminine means being soft, receptive, and – look out, here it comes – submissive." She went on to further define her point in an April 16 interview on The Today Show by saying that she believes women being submissive in relationships is a sign of strength – not weakness. "We don’t worry about (men) having it all, so I don’t know where we got this idea to have it all".

In 2022, she appeared as herself in an episode of Billions.

In 2025, shoe company Vionic announced Reece as its first Well-Being Ambassador, citing her as “an athlete, a leader, and an advocate for strength” with a philosophy “rooted in movement, a daily discipline, and showing up again and again for your well-being.”

== Personal life ==
On November 30, 1997, Reece married big-wave surfer Laird Hamilton. They have two daughters. She and Hamilton also are raising Hamilton's daughter from his previous marriage to big wave surfer and clothing designer Maria Souza. The Hamilton-Reece family splits time residing in Hawaii and Malibu, California. In the latter, she is known as a member of the "Malibu Mob", a group of celebrity friends and neighbors that includes actor John Cusack, hockey player Chris Chelios, tennis player John McEnroe, and actor John C. McGinley.
