= H2O Audio =

California-based audio accessory company

H2O Audio is a company based in San Diego, California which develops accessories for portable media players. In 2008, it was notable for being one of the top 500 fastest growing companies in the United States.

They hold various US patents, including the patent for the Commander Scroll Wheel Technology which allows for control of a touch sensitive rotatable wheel (like the one found on non touch-screen iPod models) in conjunction with a fully waterproof hard case.
