= Safran =

French aerospace and defence company

Safran S.A.

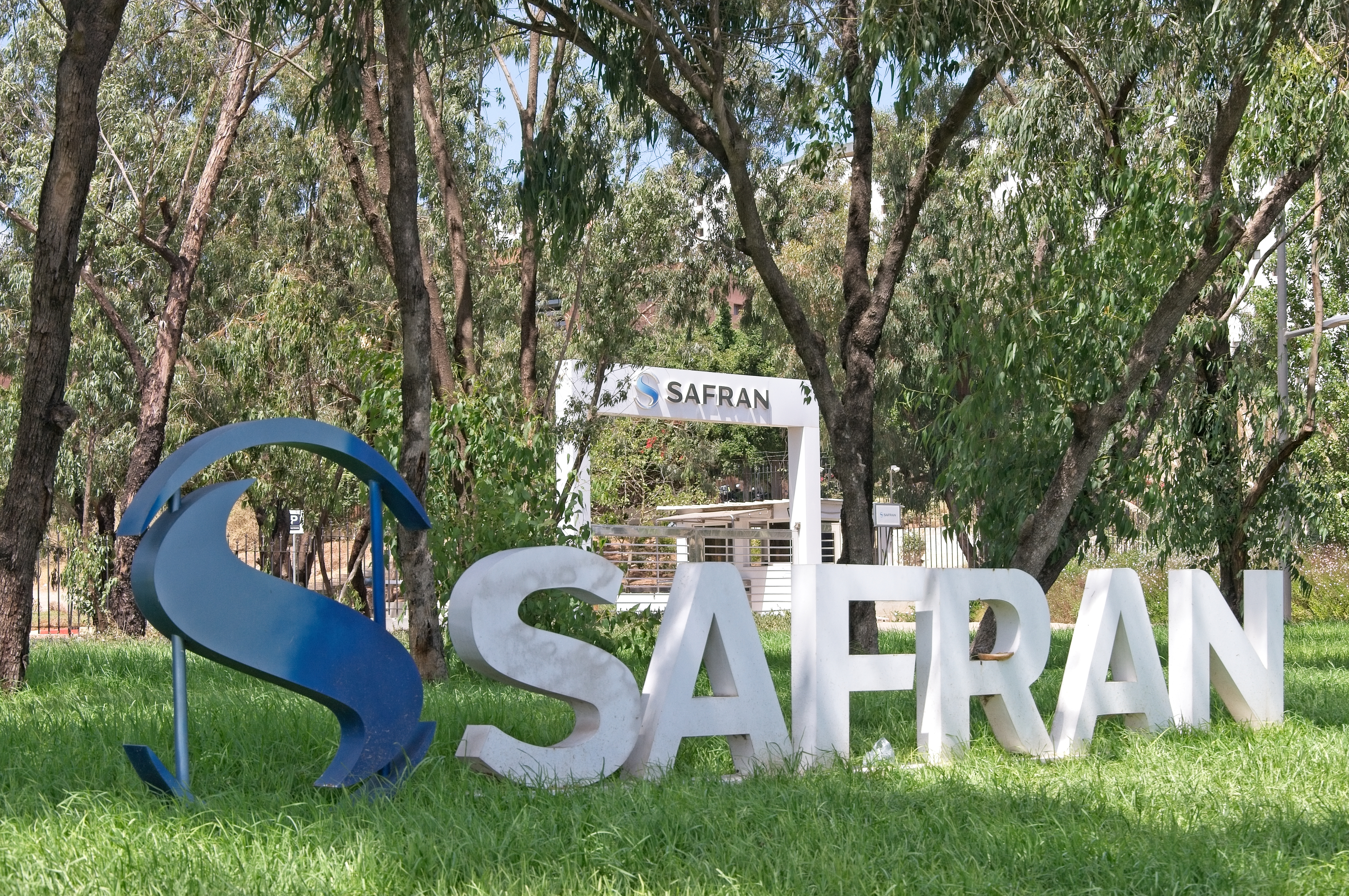
- Safran's site at Sidi Maarouf, Casablanca
- Type: Public
- Traded as: Euronext Paris: SAF; CAC 40 component
- Industry: Aerospace; Defence
- Predecessor: Snecma, Sagem
- Founded: 11 May 2005; 21 years ago
- Headquarters: Paris, France
- Key people: Olivier Andriès (CEO); Ross McInnes (chairman)
- Products: Aircraft engines, equipment, and interiors, defence electronics, avionics, navigation system, communications systems, satellites
- Revenue: ▲€31.32 billion (2025)
- Net income: ▲€3.17 billion (2025)
- Number of employees: 110,000 (2025)
- Subsidiaries: OEMServices; Safran Aero Boosters; Safran Aerosystems; Safran Aircraft Engines; Safran Cabin; Safran Ceramics; Safran Electrical & Power; Safran Electronics & Defense; Safran Helicopter Engines; Safran Landing Systems; Safran Nacelles; Safran Passenger Solutions; Safran Seats; Safran Transmission Systems; ArianeGroup (50% ownership); PowerJet (50% ownership)
- Website: safran-group.com

Safran S.A. (French pronunciation: [safʁɑ̃]) is a French multinational aerospace, defence and security corporation headquartered in Paris. It designs, develops and manufactures both commercial and military aircraft engines; launch vehicle, spacecraft and missile propulsion systems; as well as various other aerospace and military equipment and devices.

Safran was founded in 2005 through a merger between the aerospace engine manufacturer SNECMA and the electronics specialist SAGEM. The subsequent acquisition of Zodiac Aerospace by the company in 2018 significantly expanded its aeronautical activities.

Safran is a sprawling enterprise with various subsidiaries and employs over 92,000 people worldwide. The company is listed on the Euronext stock exchange and is part of the CAC 40 and Euro Stoxx 50.

Safran at 9th Bengaluru Space Expo 2026, BIEC

== Name ==
The name Safran was chosen from 4,250 suggestions, including 1,750 proposed by employees. As a holding company for many subsidiaries, the name was deemed suitable for the suggestion of direction, movement, and strategy. Safran translates as "rudder blade" and as "saffron", which the company highlights as one of the catalysts for early international trade.

== History ==
=== Origins ===
In 1905, Louis Seguin created the company Gnome. Production of the first rotary engine for airplanes, the Gnome Omega, started in 1909. This company merged with Le Rhône, a company created in 1912 by Louis Verdet, to form the Gnome et Rhône engine company. Gnome & Rhône was nationalized in 1945, creating Snecma. In 2000, this company gave its name to the "Snecma Group", and carried out a number of acquisitions to form a larger group with an array of complementary businesses.

Sagem (Société d'Applications Générales de l'Electricité et de la Mécanique) was created in 1925 by Marcel Môme. In 1939, Sagem entered the telephone and transmissions market by taking control of Société anonyme des télécommunications (SAT). It acquired Société de Fabrication d'Instruments de Mesure (Sfim), a measurement instrument specialist, in 1999. However, by 2008, Sagem Mobile and Sagem Communications had been sold. Sagem Mobile became Sagem Wireless in January 2009.

=== Safran Group ===
The Safran Group was created on 11 May 2005 with the merger of Snecma and Sagem SA.

In June 2014, Arianespace CEO Stéphane Israël announced that European efforts to remain competitive in response to SpaceX's recent success have begun in earnest. This included the creation of a new joint venture company from Arianespace's two largest shareholders: the launch-vehicle producer Airbus and engine-producer Safran.

By May 2015, Safran had created with Airbus Group a launcher joint venture called Airbus Safran Launchers. This entity developed the Ariane 6 launch vehicle for its initial flights in July 2024.

In January 2017, Safran initiated a takeover of the aircraft interior supplier Zodiac Aerospace to create the third largest aerospace supplier with $22.5 billion revenue, behind United Technologies with $28.2 billion and GE Aviation with $24.7 billion; the new group will be 92,000-employee strong, with 48% of its business in aircraft systems and equipment, from landing gears to seats, 46% in propulsion and 6% in defense.

In February 2017, Christopher Hohn, a London-based investor and CEO of TCI Fund Management, opposed the acquisition deal with Zodiac, citing concerns about the target's debt levels. At the time, Hohn held 4% of Safran shares.

In May 2017, Safran announced the completion of the sale of its identity and security activities to Advent International for Euro 2.4 billion.

In February 2018, Safran took control of Zodiac Aerospace, significantly expanding its aircraft equipment activities. Zodiac Aerospace has 32,500 employees and generated sales of 5.1 billion euros for its fiscal year ended 31 August 2017.

On 4 June 2018, Boeing and Safran announced their 50-50 partnership to design, build and service auxiliary power units after regulatory and antitrust clearance in the second half of 2018. This could threaten the dominance of Honeywell and United Technologies.

In July 2023, Safran agreed to acquire Raytheon subsidiary Collins Aerospace's actuation and flight controls business unit in an all-cash deal worth $1.8 billion. However, the Italian government used its Golden Share in Microtecnica to veto the sale in the belief it would give Safran the commercial ability to sabotage Eurofighter components production. RTX legally challenged the use of the veto. The deal eventually successfully closed in July 2025. The transaction is expected to yield about $50m in annual pre-tax run-rate cost synergies by 2028 for Safran.

In September 2024, Safran acquired Preligens, a company that specialises in artificial intelligence for aerospace and defense, for $243.3 million and announced it would become a part of the Safran Electronics & Defense business area.

As of June 2025, Safran Aircraft Engines and Safran Electricals & Power operate facilities in Hyderabad in India to manufacture rotating turbine seals for the LEAP engine and electrical harnesses for the LEAP engine, Rafale jets, Falcon 10X and FADEC, respectively. Additionally, Safran plans to establish a new subsidiary — Safran Aircraft Engine Services India — in Hyderabad for maintenance and overhaul of Rafale's Snecma M88 engines of the Indian Air Force fleet by 2026-end. The project is expected to generate 150 jobs by inauguration and eventually an additional 750 jobs.

Safran is expected to establish an assembly line in M88 engine in India to support the 144 Rafale acquisition of the Indian Air Force.

In May 2026, Safran Electronics & Defense and Baykar signed a strategic partnership agreement covering the development of integrated unmanned aerial systems, advanced navigation technologies, and smart weapon systems. The agreement includes the integration of Safran’s Euroflir electro-optical systems onto Bayraktar TB2 platforms. The partnership combines Safran’s expertise in optronic sensors and navigation with Baykar’s experience in UAV development and operations.

== Group organisation ==
The Safran group is divided into three main branches:

=== Aerospace propulsion ===
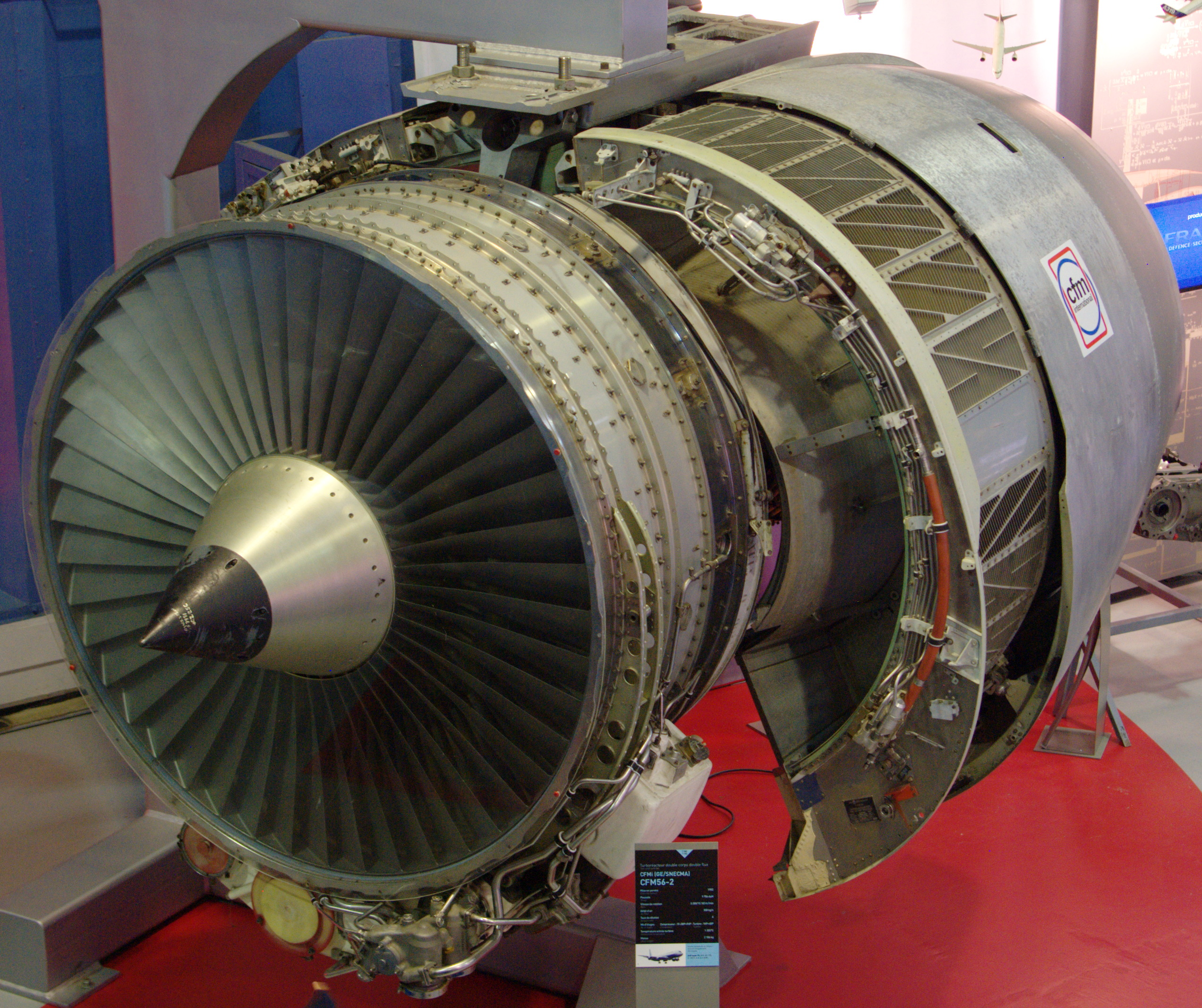
The CFM International CFM56, the most widespread turbofan, is produced by a 50-50 joint venture with GE.

The aerospace propulsion branch groups all operations concerning the propulsion of aeroplanes, helicopters, missiles, and launchers, for the civil aviation, military aviation, and space markets: design, production, marketing, testing, maintenance, repair, and overhaul (MRO).

- Safran Aircraft Engines (formerly Snecma Moteurs)
  - Commercial & military engines, liquid propulsion for space launchers
- Safran Helicopter Engines
  - Turboshaft engines for helicopters
  - Jet engines for training and support aircraft
  - Turbines for missiles and drones (Microturbo subsidiary)
  - APU (Microturbo subsidiary). Safran provides APU systems since 1962.
    - Safran Microturbo
- Safran Aero Boosters
  - Components for aircraft and rocket engines
- Safran Transmission Systems
  - Power transmissions for aircraft engines
- ArianeGroup
  - Solid rocket motors for launchers, strategic and tactical missiles
  - Thermostructural composite materials
- PowerJet
  - 50-50 joint venture with Russian-owned UEC Saturn to make SaM146 engines

At the October 2018 NBAA convention, Safran presented its ENGINeUS electric motor range up to 500 kW (670 hp) designed for electric aircraft, starting with a 45 kW (60 hp) one with integrated control electronics, with an energy efficiency of over 94% and a power-to-weight ratio of 2.5 kW / kg at 2,500 rpm and 172 N⋅m (127 lb⋅ft) of torque, for a 18-kilogram (40 lb) weight with the controller, 12 kilograms (26 lb) without. Flight-testing may happen in 2019 or 2020.

==== Other subsidiaries ====
- Safran Test Cells, Inc.
- Safran Oil Systems
- Smartec
- SMA Engines
- Snecma Services Brussels
- Snecma Suzhou
- Snecma Xinyi Airfoil Castings

=== Aircraft Equipment, Defense and Aerosystems ===
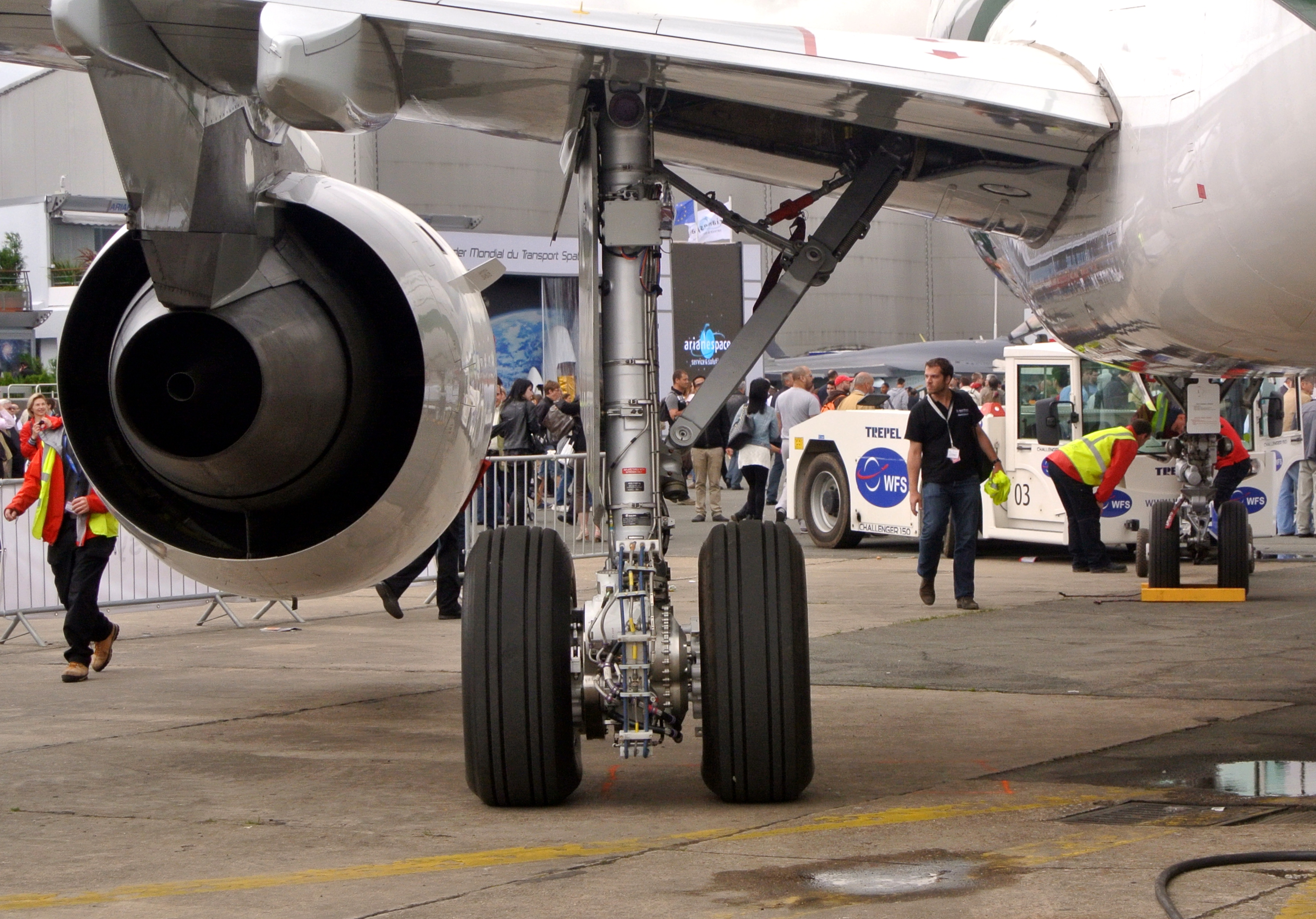
Electric Green Taxiing System made with Messier-Bugatti-Dowty

The aircraft equipment branch groups all design, production, sales, and support operations for systems and equipment used by civil and military airplanes and helicopters.

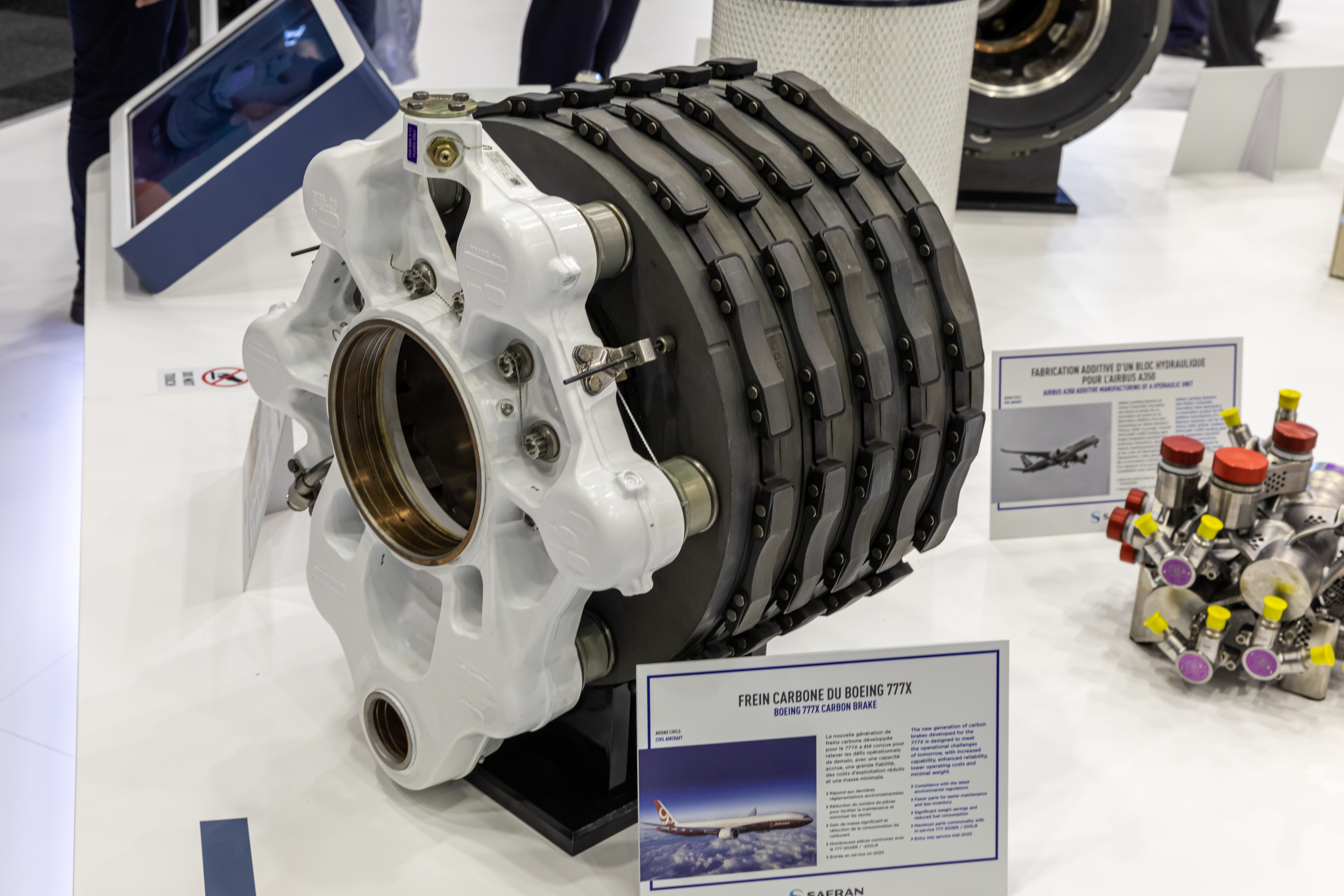
Boeing 777X carbon brakes made by Safran Landing Systems

- Safran Landing Systems
  - Landing gear design, manufacture, and support
  - Wheels and carbon brakes for mainline commercial jets
  - Braking control and hydraulic systems
- Safran Nacelles
  - Commercial airplane engine nacelles and thrust reversers
- Safran Electrical & Power
  - Aircraft wiring and power distribution
- Safran Electronics & Defense
  - Technologies and services in optronics, avionics, electronics and safety-critical software
- Safran Aerosystems
  - Equipment and systems in fluid management and security
- Safran Engineering Services
  - Engineering and consulting company

==== Other subsidiaries ====
- SLCA
- Sofrance
- Technofan Inc.
- OEMServices
- Sagem Avionics
- Vectronix
- IdentoGO

=== Aircraft Interiors ===
- Safran Cabin
  - Cabin interiors
- Safran Seats
  - Passenger and technical seats
- Safran Passenger Solutions
  - Cabin equipment and solutions focused on passenger comfort

== Corporate affairs ==
=== Shareholder profile ===
As of 30 June 2025

- Public: 82.39%
- French state: 11.72%
- Employees: 5.55%
- Treasury shares: 0.34%

== See also ==
- Musée aéronautique et spatial Safran - Museum managed by Safran containing French heritage aircraft engines
- List of aircraft engine manufacturers
