= Charles Dumont (politician) =

French politician (1867–1939)

Charles Emile Etienne Dumont
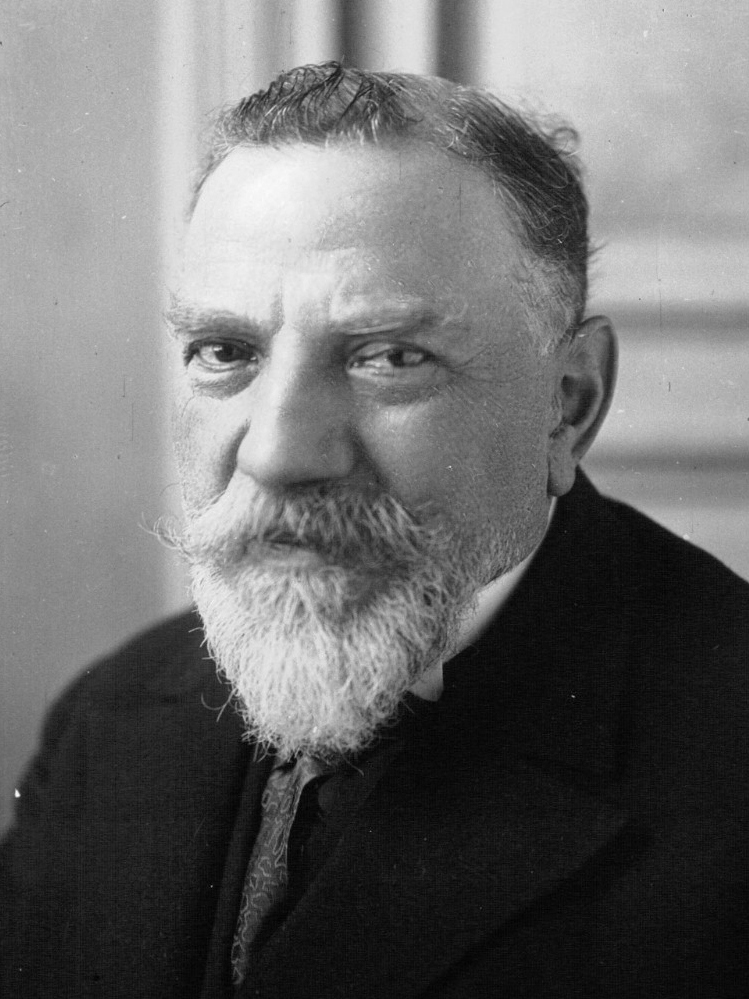
- Dumont in 1928

Minister of Public Works, Posts and Telegraphs
- In office 2 March 1911 – 27 June 1911
- Prime Minister: Ernest Monis
- Preceded by: Louis Puech
- Succeeded by: Victor Augagneur

Minister of Finance
- In office 22 March 1913 – 2 December 1913
- Prime Minister: Louis Barthou
- Preceded by: Louis-Lucien Klotz
- Succeeded by: Joseph Caillaux

Minister of Finance
- In office 21 February 1930 – 2 March 1930
- Prime Minister: Camille Chautemps
- Preceded by: Henry Chéron
- Succeeded by: Paul Reynaud

Minister of the Navy
- In office 27 January 1931 – 20 February 1932
- Prime Minister: Pierre Laval
- Preceded by: Albert Sarraut
- Succeeded by: Georges Leygues

Personal details
- Born: 31 August 1867 Ajaccio, Corsica, France
- Died: 22 April 1939 (aged 71) Meulan, Seine-et-Oise, France
- Occupation: Politician

Charles Émile Étienne Dumont (French pronunciation: [ʃaʁl emil etjɛn dymɔ̃]; 31 August 1867 – 22 April 1939) was a left-leaning French politician who was Minister of Public Works in 1911 and Minister of Finance in 1913. The "Dumont Resolution" passed by the Chamber of Deputies in 1917 called for security after World War I (1914–18) to be based on the armed forces of France and her allies, and also for the establishment of a society of nations. Dumont was again Minister of Finance in 1930, and was Minister of the Navy in 1931–32. He initiated construction of the battleship Dunkerque as part of a naval expansion program. Dumont came from a family of peasant winemakers from the Jura, and did much to promote development of that region as president of the Jura Departmental Council from 1921 to 1939.

== Life ==
=== Early years ===
Charles Dumont was born in Ajaccio, Corsica, on 31 August 1867. His family came from Jura, and had been peasant winemakers in Brainans, near Poligny, for three centuries. His father worked in the Posts department and had been assigned to a position in Ajaccio. Charles Dumont was well educated. He completed his secondary education at the Lycée Henri-IV, then went to the Sorbonne where he earned a Bachelor of Science and then a degree in Law. He became involved in politics as a student, and became general secretary of an anti-Boulangist committee. In 1891 he began to teach secondary school, first at the lycée of Puy, then of Bourges and finally at Lons-le-Saunier. He wrote two books in this period, one on the Bulgarian issue and one on the fight against anarchist and pacifist propaganda. He became a Freemason.

=== Deputy ===
Dumont was elected deputy for the district of Poligny, Jura, on 22 May 1898 and joined the Radical group. He was reelected in April–May 1902 and 6–20 May 1906. He took a socialist position in favor of the strikes of 1904 and 1909, and in support of workers' pensions. Article four of the proposed 1905 law for the separation of church and state allowed for creation of associations culturelles, mainly composed of lay Catholics, which would inherit properties such as churches and presbyteries. In April 1905 Dumont and Maurice Allard, who was also from the Left, objected to article four since they wanted to sever any connections between the Church of Rome and the associations culturelles. Dumont was interested in fiscal matters throughout his political career. He was general rapporteur for the 1910 budget. He was reelected in April–May 1910, and on 2 March 1911 was appointed Minister of Public Works, Posts and Telegraphs in the cabinet of Ernest Monis, holding office until 27 June 1911.

Dumont was made Minister of Finance in the cabinet of Louis Barthou formed on 22 March 1913. In October–November 1913 Dumont, Barthou, Foreign Affairs minister Stéphen Pichon and General Joseph Joffre were involved in finalizing an agreement with the Russian premier Count Vladimir Kokovtsov for a railway loan. At the last moment the negotiations stalled when Joffre said the protocol must have a supplement that said the railways would be built to the plan agreed by the Chiefs of the General Staffs of France and Russia, which the Tsar had approved at the start of September. Kokovtsov did not know of this plan, and was unable to agree. With a looming threat of war, Dumont lost office on 2 December 1913 over a dispute about whether pensions should be immune when a loan to the Treasury was required in the event of an emergency.

Dumont retained his seat in the general elections of April–May 1914. During World War I (1914–18) he was the delegate of the Budget Committee for verification of war material. In this role he undertook numerous missions to the front lines. His influential but confidential reports were not published until after the war. During a debate in June 1917 over France's post-war goals, Dumont came up with a resolution that reasserted France's claim to Alsace-Lorraine and the requirement for German reparations, then defined a compromise position between those who looked to international organizations for peacekeeping and those who preferred more traditional means. The resolution said,

... Far removed from any thought of conquest of subjugation of foreign populations, [the French parliament] counts on the effort of the armies of the Republic and the Allied armies to provide, once Prussian militarism has been destroyed, durable guarantees of peace and independence for peoples, great and small, within an organization, to be prepared immiediately, of the society of nations.

The "Dumont Resolution" passed by 467 votes to 52, with 39 socialists voting in favor and 47 against. Despite the government commitment to the Dumont Resolution, the SFIO (socialist) deputies continued to agitate for establishment of a society of nations. Dumont was reelected deputy for Poligny on the Republican Union list in the general elections of 16 November 1919. In April 1920 he was again general rapporteur of the budget bill.

=== Provincial politics ===
Dumont was elected councilor for Jura in 1913. He was president of the General Council of Jura from 1921 to 1939. He tried to improve the organization of tourism in the region, and to make it more accessible through a major highway through Poligny and the col de la Faucille. On 9 March 1914 he was named board member (administrateur) of the Société Centrale des Banques de Province (SCBP), and on 19 March 1914 President of the SCBP, holding this position until 23 March 1922, when he and eight administrators resigned.

=== Senator ===
Dumont was elected Senator on 6 January 1924 to replace Stéphen Pichon, who had retired. He sat with the Democratic Left in the Senate, and twice was general rapporteur of the budget. He was appointed Minister of Finance in the first cabinet of Camille Chautemps from 21 February to 2 March 1930. He was Minister of the Navy in three successive cabinets of Pierre Laval from 27 January 1931 to 20 February 1932. He presided over a naval expansion, and initiated construction of the battleship Dunkerque. At one time Dumont was president of the Banque Franco-Japonaise.

Charles Dumont died of a heart attack in Meulan, Seine-et-Oise, on 22 April 1939 at the age of 72.

== Publications ==
- Charles Dumont (January 1894). Patrie et internationalisme (in French). Bourges: Tardy-Pigelet.
- Charles Dumont (1894). Une semaine dans les Causses (in French). Lons-le-Saunier: C. Verpillat. p. 87.
- Charles Dumont (21 March 1905). Proposition de loi sur l'administration de l'armée (services de l'intendance et de santé) (in French). Paris: Motteroz. p. 80.
- Charles Dumont (1906). Gouvernement général de l'Indo-Chine. Territoire de Kouang-Tcheou (Chine). Notice publiée à l'exposition coloniale de Marseille (in French). Hanoï: Gallois. p. 80.
- Charles Dumont; Léon Mougeot (26 June 1906). Proposition de loi sur l'administration de l'armée (services de l'intendance et de santé) (in French). Paris: Motteroz. p. 80.
- Charles Dumont (1915). Mesures d'après guerre. Titres au porteur détruits, volés, perdus, législation belge en vigueur, mesures conservatoires possibles actuellement, nécessité d'une législation spéciale, système français et système allemand, projet de loi belge, avec un appendice exposant les mesures à prendre pour les titres des pays alliés et neutres (in French). Paris: L. Tenin. p. 63.
- Charles Dumont (1926). La Lutte contre Abd-el-Krim (in French). Paris: Impr. du Sénat.

== Sources ==
- Engelbrecht, Helmuth Carol; Hanighen, Frank Cleary (1934). Merchants of Death: A Study of the International Armament Industry. Ludwig von Mises Institute. ISBN 978-1-61016-390-3.
- Estaunié, Édouard (1973). Souvenirs. Librairie Droz. ISBN 978-2-600-03527-9.
- Goldberg, Harvey (1962). The Life of Jean Jaurès. Univ of Wisconsin Press. ISBN 978-0-299-02564-9.
- Jackson, Peter (5 December 2013). Beyond the Balance of Power: France and the Politics of National Security in the Era of the First World War. Cambridge University Press. ISBN 978-1-107-03994-0.
- Jolly, Jean (1977). "Charles DUMONT". Dictionnaire des parlementaires français de 1889 à 1940.
- Kokovtsov, Vladimir (1935). Out of My Past: Memoirs of Count Kokovtsov. Stanford University Press. ISBN 978-0-8047-1553-9.
- Moreau, Richard (1 April 2010). Pasteur et Besançon, naissance d'un génie. Editions L'Harmattan. ISBN 978-2-296-24751-2.
- Roberts, Mary Louise (15 February 2009). Civilization without Sexes: Reconstructing Gender in Postwar France, 1917-1927. University of Chicago Press. ISBN 978-0-226-72127-9.
