= Euronext Paris =

Stock exchange in Paris, France

- Type: Stock exchange
- Location: Paris, France
- Coordinates: 48°52′07.42″N 02°19′37.81″E
- Founded: 24 September 1724; 302 years ago (as Paris Bourse); 22 September 2000; 26 years ago (as Euronext Paris)
- Owner: Euronext
- Key people: Delphine d'Amarzit (CEO)
- Currency: EUR
- No. of listings: 795
- Market cap: US$4.58 trillion
- Indices: CAC 40; CAC Next 20; CAC Mid 60; CAC Small; CAC All-Tradable
- Website: live.euronext.com/en/markets/paris

Euronext Paris, formerly known as the Paris Bourse (French: Bourse de Paris), is a regulated securities trading venue in France. It is Europe's second largest stock exchange by market capitalization, behind the London Stock Exchange, as of December 2023. As of 2022, the 795 companies listed had a combined market capitalization of over US$4.58 trillion.

Since September 2000, the Paris Bourse has been part of Euronext, of which it was a co-founder together with the Amsterdam Stock Exchange and Brussels Stock Exchange. It was subsequently rebranded Euronext Paris.

== History ==
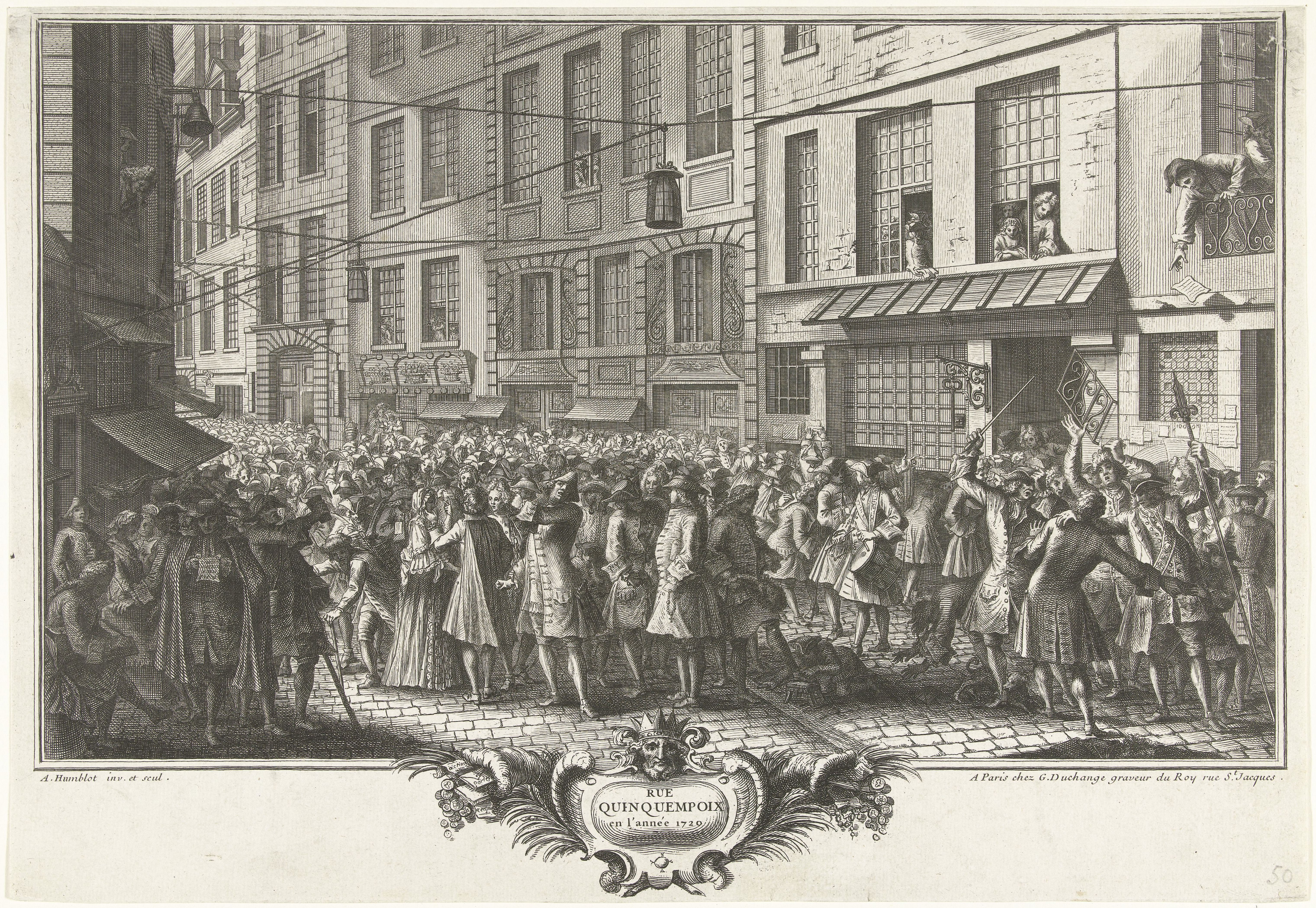
Engraving of the securities market on rue Quincampoix in Paris during the Mississippi bubble in 1720

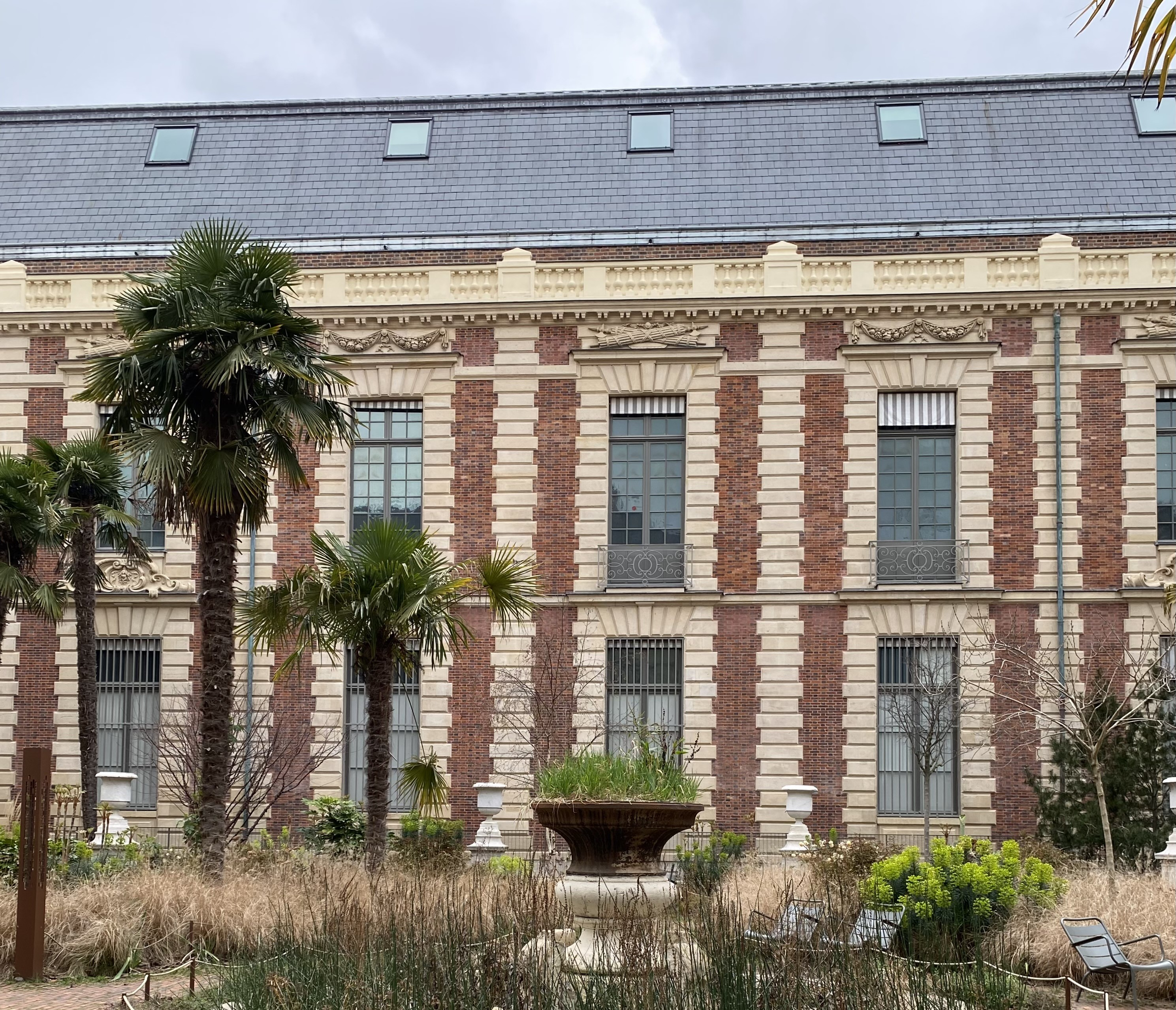
Rear wing of the former Palais Mazarin in Paris; the street level hosted the bourse from the 1720s to 1791

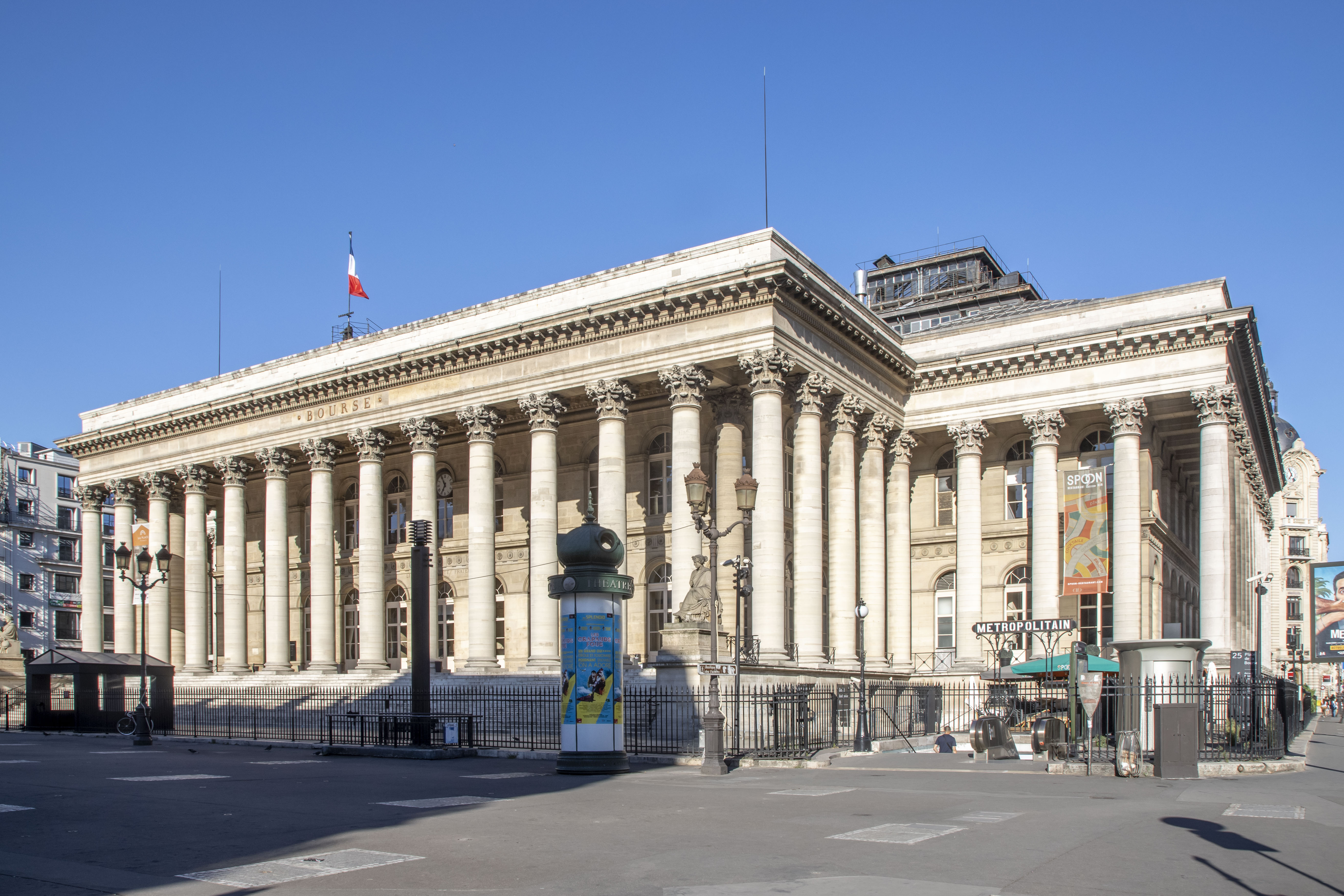
The Palais Brongniart, home of the bourse during most of the 19th and 20th centuries

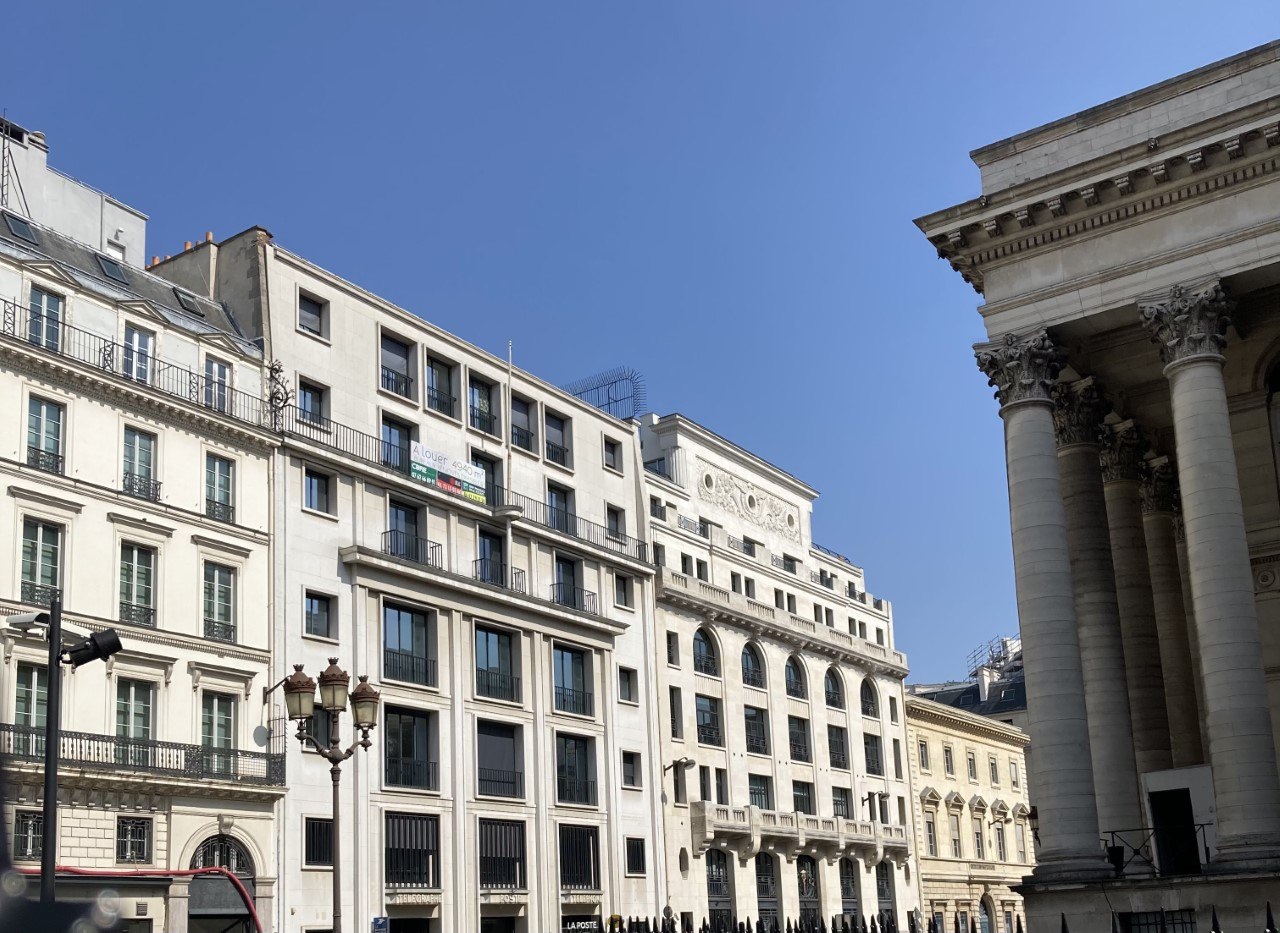
Building at 4, place de la Bourse (center right), former seat of the Compagnie des agents de change until 1988

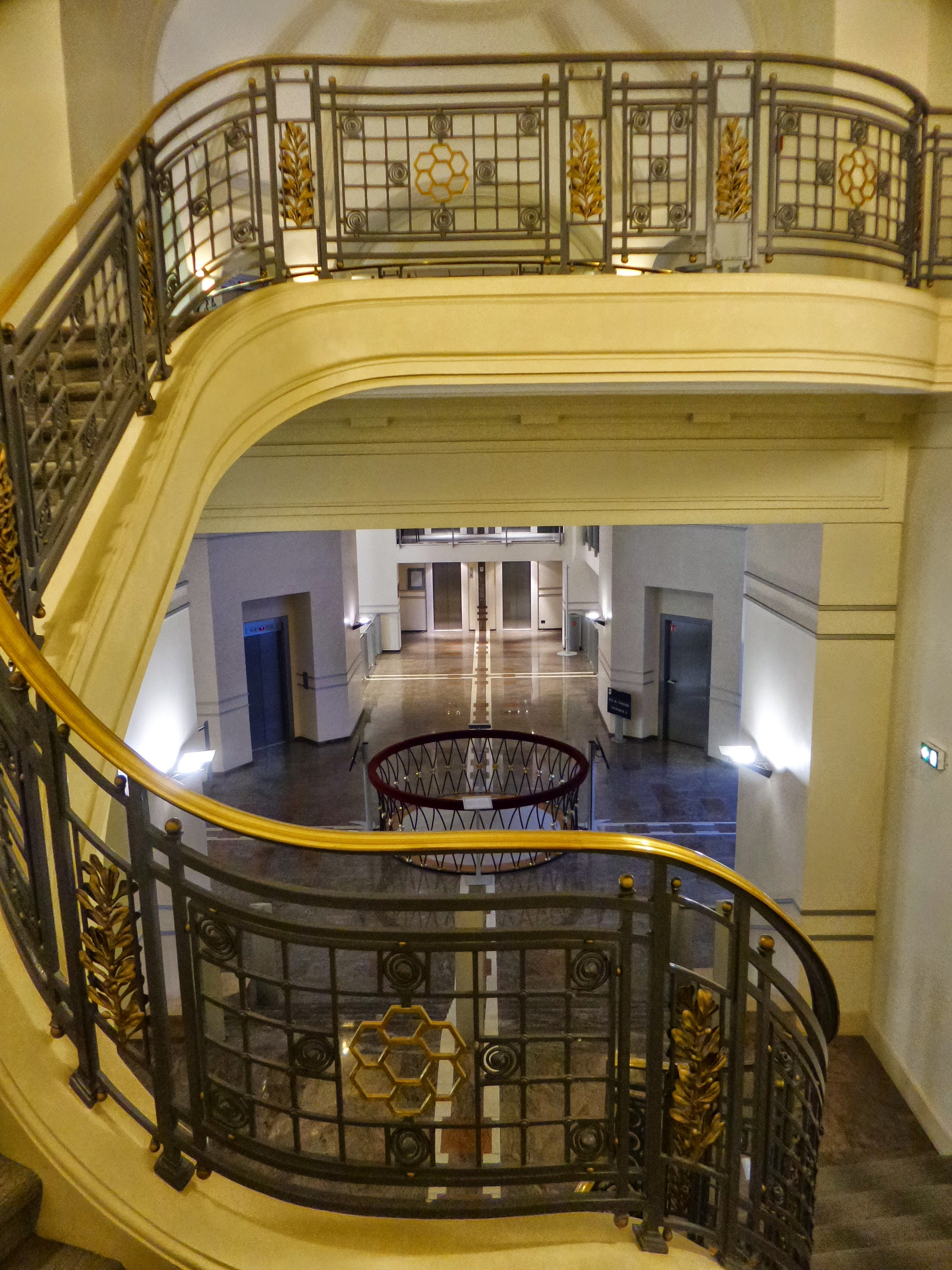
Interior of the headquarters of SBF, then Euronext at 39–41, rue Cambon, in 2014

The Paris stock market started taking shape in the early 18th century, and first acquired prominence with trading of John Law's Company from 1717 to 1721. In 1724, a government decree gave it its first permanent regulation and is occasionally though dubiously taken as the market's starting point.

On 5 March 1886, anarchist Charles Gallo targeted it during the Paris Stock Exchange bombing, a propaganda of the deed attack. He entered the building, threw a bomb that failed to explode, and then began shooting at the traders who were selling government bonds.

From the second half of the 19th century, official stock markets in Paris were operated by the Compagnie des agents de change, directed by the elected members of a stockbrokers' syndical council. The number of dealers in each of the different trading areas of the Bourse was limited. There were around 60 agents de change (the official stockbrokers). An agent de change had to be a French citizen, be nominated by a former agent or his estate, and be approved by the Minister of Finance, and he was appointed by decree of the President of the Republic. Officially, the agents de change could not trade for their own account nor even be a counterpart to someone who wanted to buy or sell securities with their aid; they were strictly brokers, that is, intermediaries. In the financial literature, the Paris Bourse is hence referred to as order-driven market, as opposed to quote-driven markets or dealer markets, where price-setting is handled by a dealer or market-maker. In Paris, only agents de change could receive a commission, at a rate fixed by law, for acting as an intermediary. However, parallel arrangements were usual in order to favor some clients' quote. The Commodities Exchange was housed in the same building until 1889, when it moved to the present Bourse de commerce. Moreover, until about the middle of the 20th century, a parallel market known as "La Coulisse" was in operation.

Until the late 1980s, the market operated as an open outcry exchange, with the agents de change meeting on the exchange floor of the Palais Brongniart. In 1986, the Paris Bourse started to implement an electronic trading system. This was known generically as CATS (Computer Assisted Trading System), but the Paris version was called CAC (Cotation Assistée en Continu). By 1989, quotations were fully automated. The Palais Brongniart hosted the French financial derivatives exchanges MATIF and MONEP, until they were fully automated in 1998.

In 1988, new legislation was adopted that radically reformed the governance of the Paris stock exchange. Its ownership was transferred to the former Compagnie des agents de change ("brokers' society"), which, on the occasion renamed itself as the Société des Bourses Françaises (SBF, "French Stock Exchange Company"). In 1999, the SBF absorbed what remained of MATIF and MONEP and altered its name to Paris Bourse-SBF. The next year, SBF was a leading participant of the merger that formed Euronext.

=== Past locations ===
The Paris securities markets first emerged in rue Quincampoix, a small street near les Halles in Paris, in the early 18th century. It remained on rue Quincampoix until closed by government decision on 22 March 1720, at a time when most of its activity was focused on trading the shares and other securities of John Law's Company. The turmoil of that year and gradual unraveling of Law's system was accompanied by several relocations of the market, first to the place Vendôme then to the garden of the Hôtel de Soissons near les Halles. It eventually relocated in October 1720 in the rear garden of Hôtel Tubeuf, which by that time was part of the headquarters complex of Law's Company that also included the Hôtel de Nevers. The market remained on that location until 27 June 1793 when it suspended operations in the chaotic context of the French Revolution. The building later became part of the Bibliothèque nationale de France, which had first been located in the Hôtel de Nevers in the 1720s.

The market reopened on 10 May 1795 in the Louvre Palace, in Anne of Austria's former summer apartment on the ground floor of the Petite Galerie, and stayed there until 9 September 1795. In September 1795, the Bourse again closed for a few months; it reopened in January 1796 in the church of Notre-Dame-des-Victoires, then in October 1807, moved to the Palais-Royal, and finally, in March 1818, to the former Couvent des Filles-Saint-Thomas.

By then, a permanent home for the stock exchange was under construction on an adjacent site, soon known as the Palais Brongniart for its architect Alexandre-Théodore Brongniart who died before the building was completed. Brongniart had submitted his project, which was a rectangular neoclassical Roman temple with a giant Corinthian colonnade enclosing a vaulted and arcaded central chamber. His designs were endorsed by Napoleon and won Brongniart that major public commission at the end of his career. After his death in 1813, the building was completed by Éloi Labarre from 1813 to 1826. On 6 November 1826, the stock exchange finally moved into the Palais Brongniart, which was and remains owned by the City of Paris. From 1901 to 1905, Jean-Baptiste-Frederic Cavel designed the addition of two lateral wings, resulting in a cruciform plan with innumerable columns. According to the architectural historian Andrew Ayers, these alterations "did nothing to improve the reputation of this uninspiring monument." After Euronext stopped using the building, it was repurposed by the City of Paris as an events venue.

Following the 1988 reform, the Compagnie des agents de change, renamed SBF, left its iconic art deco seat at 4, place de la Bourse to move to the former Paris office of Société Centrale des Banques de Province then Chase Manhattan Bank at 39, rue Cambon. That building remained the seat of SBF, then Euronext Paris until the latter moved to La Défense in 2015. The building on rue Cambon was subsequently restructured to house offices of Chanel.

== Operations ==
It operates the MATIF futures exchange, which trades futures and options on interest rate products and commodities, and MONEP, equity and index futures and options. All products are traded electronically on the NSC system adopted by all of the Euronext members. Transactions are cleared through LCH.Clearnet. Cash settlement is T+2. Trading hours are 9 am to 5:30 pm CET, Monday to Friday.

== Structure and indices ==
The French equities market is divided into three sections. The Premier Marché, formerly called the Official List, includes large French and foreign companies, and most Bond issues. The Second Marché, lists medium-sized companies, while nouveau marché lists fast-growing start up companies seeking capital to finance expansion, linked to Euro.nm, the European equity growth market. A third market, Marché Libre, is nonregulated, administered by Euronext Paris for transactions in securities not listed on the other three markets.

Euronext Paris calculates a family of indices. The CAC 40 is the exchange's benchmark, disseminated in real time. Its components are included in the broader SBF 120 Index, a benchmark for investment funds. The SBF 250 index, a benchmark for the long-term performance of equity portfolios, includes all of the SBF 120; it is structured by sector. The MIDCAC index includes 100 of the most liquid medium-size stocks on the Premier Marché and Nouveau Marché calculated on the basis of opening and closing prices, while the Second Marché index focuses on that market. Both indices are benchmarks for funds. The Nouveau Marché Index represents stocks in the growth market. The SBF-FCI index is based on a selection of convertible bonds that represent at least 70% of the total capitalization of this market, calculated twice daily. For derivatives, MONEP trades short-term and long-term stock options and futures and options on a family of Dow Jones indices. Euronext Commodities products include commodity future and options on European rapeseed and futures on rapeseed meal, European rapeseed oil, milling wheat, corn, wood pellets, dairy and Paris Real Estate.

== See also ==
- List of French companies
- CAC 40
- CAC Next 20
- French Society of Financial Analysts
