= Jean-Louis Bory =

French writer, journalist and film critic (1919–1979)

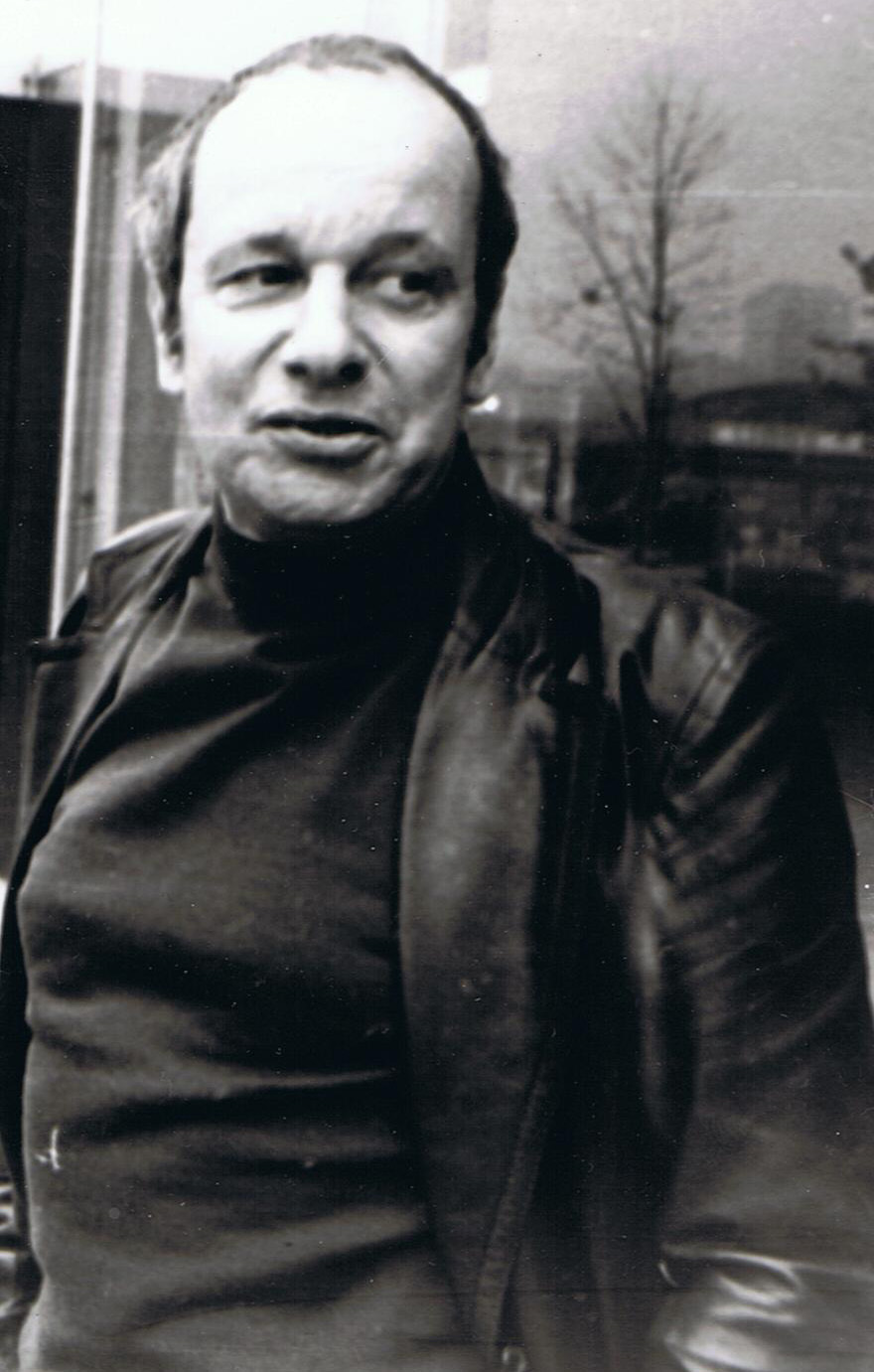
Jean-Louis Bory

Jean-Louis Bory (25 June 1919 – 11 June 1979) was a French writer, journalist, and film critic.

== Life ==
Jean-Louis Bory was born on 25 June 1919 in Méréville, Essonne.

The son of a pharmacist and a teacher, he came from a family of teachers. With an atheist father and a non-practicing mother, religion played a minor role in his development. It was rather the Popular Front that formed his character. A brilliant student at Étampes, he entered the Lycée Henri-IV.

Just when he was ready to enter the École Normale Supérieure in 1939, he was called up for military service. Returning to the Latin Quarter in October 1942, he passed his agrégation des lettres examinations in July 1945. Two months later, Flammarion published his first novel, Mon village à l'heure allemande, which won the Prix Goncourt with the support of Colette. Its sales of 500,000 copies represented an exceptional success, even as he was assigned a position in Haguenau in the province of Bas-Rhin. The money enabled him to buy from the Countess Cally, his aunt, the property his grandparents has acquired in 1880 in Méréville. It was known as "Villa des Iris", and he renamed it "La Calife" or "The Caliph". His second book (Dear Agle, 1947) proved less successful. In 1948 he was assigned to the Paris region and was able to collaborate at the La Gazette des Lettres with Robert Kanters, Paul Guth and François Mauriac.

Politically, he was of that generation disappointed that there was no development from "resistance movement to revolution." He was even solicited by Aragon to join the CPF. But he preferred to limit his membership to quasi-communist groups like the pacifist Mouvement de la Paix, the National Writers Association, and the France-USSR Association. Appointed to the Lycée Voltaire in 1950, he made his debut as a journalism in 1952 in Samedi Soir. But in 1955, he chose to follow his friend Francis Erval to L'Express, which was the mouthpiece of Pierre Mendès France, to whose politics he was increasingly attracted.

Moreover, in 1956, he broke with the Communists on Soviet intervention in Hungary against which he signed a petition with Edgar Morin, Gilles Martinet, Jean-Marie Domenach, and Georges Suffert. He also resigned from the Honorary Committee of the Association France-USSR. This did not prevent him from promoting its third-world anti-colonialist positions. Thus, in 1960, when his editor Rene Julliard proposed he sign the Manifesto of the 121, he did not hesitate and found himself suspended from the professorship he had held at the Lycée Henri-IV since 1957. He was reinstated after a few months, but this event marked a rupture in his relationship with the teaching profession for which he had always had the utmost respect. His students gave him a great deal of satisfaction, and it was not uncommon to hear the cry of joy "Mom, I've got Bory", as Michel Cournot remembered according to an article published after Bory's death in the Nouvel Observateur.

In 1957, he joined the editorial board of the Cahiers des saisons, where he published short literary texts. In 1961, he replaced François Truffaut as a film critic for the weekly Arts. The following year, he gave up teaching and his work at La Gazette des Lettres to devote himself to journalism and literature. His attempt to relaunch his literary career with L’Odeur de l'herbe (Julliard, 1962) was not a success. But joining the broadcasts of the program Le Masque et la Plume in 1964 provided him with an audience that contributed to his success as a citic. At the end 1964, out of loyalty to François Erval, he ceased his collaboration with L'Express.

In January 1965, Guy Dumur offered him the opportunity to continue his literary criticism in Nouvel Observateur. There he rehabilitated Louis-Ferdinand Céline before making friends with Paul Morand and Jacques Chardonne. And the group he gathered in Méréville in 1964/1965—François Nourissier, Hervé Bazin, Jean d'Ormesson, Georges Suffert, Louis Pauwels—marked a turn to the right. His friendship spectrum was very broad but did not restrict his work load. Starting in November 1966 he replaced Michel Cournot as film critic at Nouvel Observateur.

He ended his work for Arts he effectively became its film critic without actually working there. Famous for the jousting between him and Georges Charensol, and Aubria Michel (alias of Pierre Vallières) at Masque et la plume, he defended the cinema of the Third World, especially African and Arab. He also appeared as the most influential art critic of the Latin Quarter's "Art et Essais" circuit. But his enthusiasm peaked in May 1968 when he was among leaders who stopped the Cannes Film Festival, where he was board member one year earlier. This did not prevent him from being a member of the Selection Committee from 1970 to 1973 nor from playing a major role at the festival of La Rochelle. He visited the offices of Nouvel Observateur only to drop off his articles.

He did not inject himself into the paper's decisions that he finds politically questionable. He phoned John Daniel regularly to comment on an editorial. He argued on behalf of the Palestinian cause that he thought was not defended as it should be. He spoke up for films that were avant-garde or shocking or devoted to questioning society, its institutions and traditional values. Aside from explicitly political films that he supported irrespective of artistic considerations, he defended films he valued not so much for their subject matter as for their subversion of traditional film language.

Godard, Robbe-Grillet, Resnais, Pasolini, Duras and the Taviani brothers were filmmakers who are close to his heart. Defender of an "alternative" culture, he was often aggressive towards films of the "Boulevard", made for mere entertainment or wide distribution, those that did not challenge the taboos of morality and social life or our habits of seeing and thinking. His contempt for the films of Michel Audiard, Bourvil and Louis de Funès, which he considered bourgeois, matched his view of films like those of Henri Verneuil – exalting, according to Bory, bourgeois values, money and ambition – or those of Claude Lelouch, featuring characters socially "arrived" and thus legitimating them.

But if this freedom allowed him to devote his "chronicle of a film that will be seen neither by the author nor by [him]", it justified his very stingy wages. He considered the pledge Safer latter. As management was sorry to see him systematically ignore the big budget movies and those popular with the general public, it exerted a gentle pressure by creating a less militant competitor. But he is not really worried in 1972 and refuses to respond to the warm invitation of François Nourissier to work for Point. Instead, he brought Michel Grisolia to help prepare small notes.

The 1970s were marked by his fight for homosexuals. This is reflected in his autobiographical works, The Skin of zebras in 1969 and All Born of Woman in 1976, but especially in My Half of Orange in (1973), a public success with sales of 50,000 copies in which he publicly announced his homosexuality. He appeared in the local gay association Arcadia, making his first conference. He then argued in his division leftism, FHAR, one of whose members, Hocquenghem, became Bory's co-author of How do you call us already?. He ended at the Homosexual Liberation Group, always opposing those traditional constraints that weight most heavily on the working class and the marginalised.

Parallel to this fight, he published several essays on the popular novel, such as Eugene Sue, dandy and Socialist in 1973, and a historical essay The Revolution of July or the Three Glorious Days, in 1972. But his main success at this point in his career was Feet, which appeared in 1976 and sold over 100,000 copies. In this fantasy novel, he challenged some of the intelligentsia such as Simone de Beauvoir and Michel Foucault. Falling into a deep depression in August 1977, he re-emerged during a remission period that lasted from October 1978 to February 1979 and offered him the opportunity to publish an amusing portrait of Cambaceres in 1978. He died by suicide in Méréville during the night of 11 June 1979, aged 59.

== Works ==
- Mon village à l'heure allemande, Flammarion, 1945.
- Fragile ou le panier d'œufs, Flammarion, 1950.
- Pour Balzac et quelques autres, éditions Julliard, 1960.
- Eugène Sue, dandy et socialiste, Hachette, 1962.
- L'Odeur de l'herbe, Julliard, 1962.
- La Peau des zèbres, Gallimard, 1969.
- Cinéma I : Des yeux pour voir, 10/18, 1971.
- La Révolution de juillet, Gallimard, 1972.
- Cinéma II : La Nuit complice, 10/18, 1972.
- Cinéma III : Ombre vive, 10/18, 1973.
- Questions au cinéma (Editions Stock, 1973)
- Ma moitié d'orange (première publication en 1973 in Idéee fixe Julliard) republished "Classiques H&O poche", Béziers : H&O, 2005, 128 pages. (ISBN 2-84547-110-6)
- Cinéma IV : L'Ecran fertile, 10/18, 1974.
- Cinéma V : La Lumière écrit, 10/18, 1975.
- Tous nés d'une femme, Gallimard, 1976.
- Cinéma VI : L'Obstacle et la gerbe, 10/18, 1976.
- Cinéma VII : Rectangle multiple, 10/18, 1977.
- "Vivre à midi", in Comment nous appelez-vous déjà ? ou ces garçons que l'on dit homosexuels, with Guy Hocquenghem, Calmann-Lévy, 1977.
- Le Pied, Belfond, 1977.
- Un prix d'excellence, Gallimard, 1986.

== Biographies ==
- Daniel Garcia, Jean-Louis Bory, 1919–1979, Flammarion, 1979 (réédition en 2009).
- Marie-Claude Jardin, Jean-Louis Bory, Belfond, 1991.

== See also ==
- Archivio Conz
- Chantons sous l'Occupation – a documentary film
