= Jason DeMarte =

American photographer and digital artist

- Born: 1973 (age 52–53); Lafayette, Louisiana
- Known for: Photography and digital illustration

Jason DeMarte (born 1973) is a photographer and digital artist who photographs objects found in nature, then digitally arranges them together with Adobe Photoshop CC.

== Early life ==
DeMarte was born in 1973 in Lafayette, Louisiana, but spent most of his childhood in Colorado.

== Education ==
DeMarte earned his BFA in Photography from Colorado State University in 1997, and his MFA in Photography from the University of Oregon in 2000. While working on his MFA, he was a product photographer for Toys "R" Us.

Of how his style developed, he said, "I began working on experimental images where I was collaging multiple images from museums, bio parks, and botanical gardens, and from these experiments, I realized I could flesh out my ideas more effectively if I collected objects and brought them to my studio to shoot separately. This was a huge shift in the work. Much like a painter, it gave me the freedom and control to make compositions from scratch."

== Artistic style ==
The Rule Gallery describes DeMarte's work as "fictional tableaus that speak to our obsession with beauty, perfection and excess."

Of his work, DeMarte said, "My process draws from a long history of constructed narratives in photography, artist like Oscar Gustave Rejlander and Julia Margaret Cameron, were early pioneers in manipulating truth with the medium, while later artists like Gregory Crewdson, Jeff Wall and Anthony Goicolea made the ordinary surreal with their highly choreographed stills. My process aims to simultaneously embrace a manipulation of truth by hyper exaggerating the ordinary and to also work within a kind of truth by utilizing the inherent believability of the photographic medium."

== Career ==
DeMarte's works are included in the permanent collections of the University of Michigan Museum of Art, the Los Angeles Center for Digital Art, Los Angeles, California, and Fort Collins Colorado Historical Museum. His work has also been exhibited at the University of Michigan Museum of Art, in a 2019 solo exhibition called "The Garden of Artificial Delights." The exhibition included adhesive wallpaper that DeMarte designed, and compared DeMarte's work to that of Hieronymus Bosch and Martin Johnson Heade.

He is currently represented by Rule Gallery in Denver, Clamp Art in New York, and Wessel Snyman Creative in Cape Town, South Africa.

He is currently a professor of photography at Eastern Michigan University, and prior to that, taught at Mississippi State University, Zayed University in Dubai, and the University of New Mexico.
