= Anthony Goicolea =

American photographer (born 1971)

- Born: 1971; Atlanta, Georgia

Anthony Goicolea (born 1971) is a Amsterdam-based painter, fine art photographer, drafter, and installation artist, born in Atlanta, Georgia.

== Work ==
Goicolea's photographs frequently deal with issues of androgyny, homosexuality, and child sexuality. Goicolea was educated at the University of Georgia and studied painting, photography, and sculpture at that institution. He holds an MFA in fine arts from the Pratt Institute. He made his debut in 1999, and now shows work with Postmasters gallery in New York, Aurel Scheibler in Berlin, Germany, Gow Langsford Gallery in Auckland, New Zealand, and Galerie Ron Mandos in Amsterdam, the Netherlands.

Some of his work features photographs of "pre- to barely pubescent boys" in elaborately staged tableau settings, commonly showing multiple boys wearing traditional private school uniforms either engaged in school-life or recreation after school—but with often transgressive and erotic twists in their activities. Of great interest in these compositions is the fact that Goicolea himself portrays all of the boys in his photographs through the astute use of costumes, wigs, makeup, and post-production editing using Adobe Photoshop; "always looking uncannily like a boy on the edge of puberty". Therefore, despite having numerous figures in them, Goicolea's photographs are actually very complex large-scale self-portraits, and are always done in a flawlessly realist manner.

The pioneering fine art photographer Cindy Sherman is an apparent influence on Goicolea's work, given her own extensive use of self-portraits and emphasis on sexually charged narrative topics. Sherman and Goicolea have also had several joint exhibitions. His work can be strongly compared to similar manipulated and/or staged art photography featuring children and adolescents, such as that of Bernard Faucon, Loretta Lux, and Justine Kurland. Critic Guy Davenport was an early admirer of Goicolea's work, which he compared in 2002 to that of Faucon.

Goicolea has also been producing and exhibiting his drawings, which follow much of the same subject matter as his photographs. He has also published several books. On June 25, 2017, the day of 2017 New York City Pride March festivities, New York Governor Andrew Cuomo announced that Anthony Goicolea had been chosen to design the first official monument to LGBT individuals commissioned by the State of New York. The monument is planned to be built in Hudson River Park in Manhattan, near the waterfront Hudson River piers which have served as historically significant symbols of New York's role as a meeting place and a safe haven for LGBT communities.

== Personal life ==
Goicolea is Cuban-American and openly gay. He lives in Williamsburg, Brooklyn, New York with his partner, Paul Kelterborn.

== Selected works ==
- Nail Biter

== Commissions ==
- 2017 "LGBT Memorial" located at Hudson River Park, NYC. Commissioned by the State of New York.

== Fellowships and awards ==
- 2006 – The Cintas Fellowship
- 2005 – The BW Photo Paris Award
- 1998 – The Bronx Museum, 'Artist In The Market Place' program
- 1995 – The Joan Mitchell Foundation Grant

== Public collections ==
- The Hirshhorn Museum and Sculpture Garden, Washington, DC
- The Indianapolis Museum, Indianapolis, IN
- The North Carolina Museum of Art, Raleigh, NC
- Whitney Museum of American Art, New York
- The Museum of Modern Art, New York
- The Guggenheim Museum of Art, New York
- The Brooklyn Museum of Art, Brooklyn, NY
- Arizona State University Art Museum, Tempe, AZ
- The Museum of Helmond, Nederland
- The Groninger Museum, Groninger, Nederland
- Museum of Contemporary Photography, Chicago
- Yale University Art Collection, Photography, New Haven, CT
- El Museo de Arte Contemporaneo de Castilla, Leon, España
- The Herbert F. Johnson Museum of Art at Cornell University, Ithaca, NY
- Centro Galego De Arte Contemporanea, Santiago de Compostela, España
- University of Georgia Library, Rare Books Collection, Athens, GA

== See also ==
- LGBT culture in New York City
- List of LGBT people from New York City
- NYC Pride March
