= Frédéric Lemoine =

French businessman (born 1965)

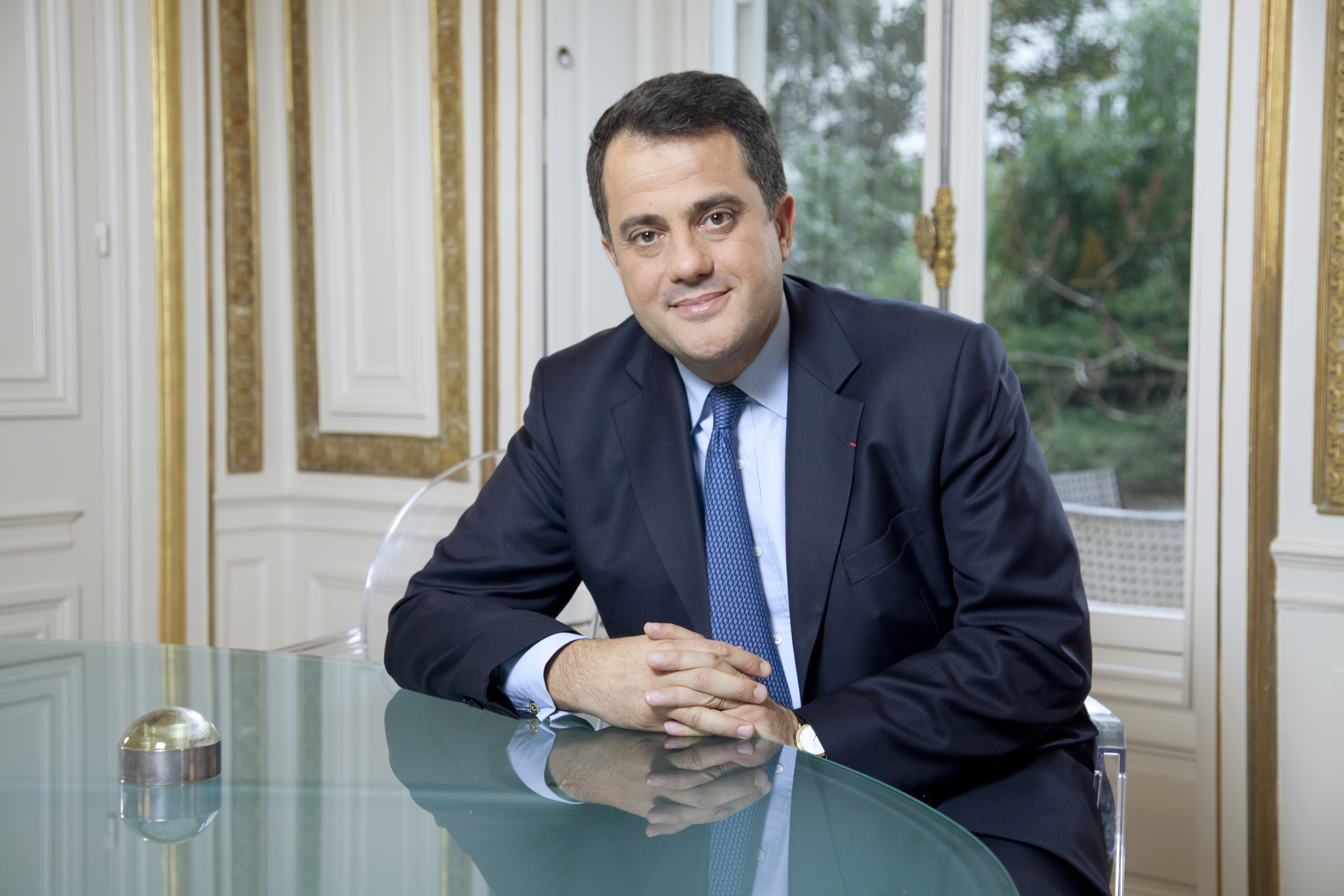
- Born: 27 June 1965 (age 61); Neuilly-sur-Seine, France
- Education: Lycée Victor-Duruy; Lycée Louis-le-Grand
- Alma mater: HEC Paris; Sciences Po, ÉNA

Frédéric Lemoine (born 27 June 1965) is a French businessman. He was Chairman of Wendel's Executive Board from April 2009 until December 2017. He was a member of the Supervisory Board of Wendel from June 2008 to April 2009. Since April 2009, he has been a board member of Saint-Gobain. Since January 2011, he has been a board member of Insead. Since 2014, he has been a board member of Orchestre à l'Ecole.

== Career in the private sector ==
After the family controlled private equity group Wendel parted company with its chief executive Jean-Bernard Lafonta in 2009, Lemoine was appointed as his successor. He served in this position from April 2009 to December 2017.

Ahead of the 2022 presidential elections, Lemoine publicly declared his support for Valérie Pécresse as the Republicans’ candidate and joined her campaign team.

== Other activities ==
=== Corporate boards ===
- Lauxera Capital Partners, Special Advisor (since 2020)
- McKinsey, Special Advisor (2004–2008)

=== Non-profit organizations ===
- Alliance for International Medical Action (ALIMA), Member of the Board (since 2018)
- Trilateral Commission, Member of the European Group
- Paris Europlace, Member of the Board of Directors
