= Paris Stock Exchange bombing =

1886 bombing and shooting in Paris, France

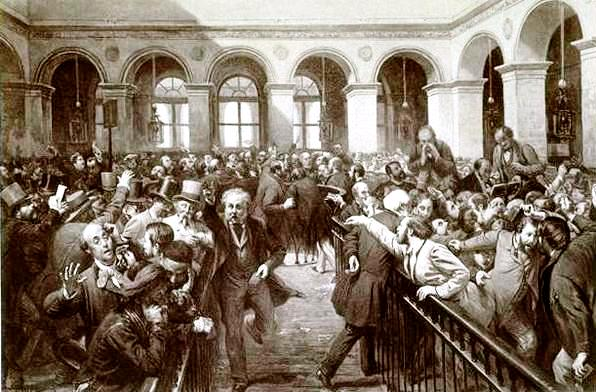
- Romanced depiction of the attack in the press of the time
- Location: 48°52′09″N 2°20′29″E; Paris Stock Exchange
- Date: 5 March 1886
- Attack type: bombing and shooting
- Deaths: 0
- Injuries: 1
- Perpetrator: Charles Gallo
- Motive: Anarchism, propaganda of the deed
- Accused: 1
- Verdict: Guilty
- Convicted: 1

The Paris Stock Exchange bombing was a bomb and armed attack carried out by anarchist Charles Gallo against the Paris Stock Exchange on 5 March 1886. Along with the Thiers statue bombing (1881) and the Black Band, it was one of the first propaganda of the deed attacks in France.

In the 1880s, after anarchist theorists developed the propaganda of the deed strategy—the idea that an action could create effective political propaganda and lead to a revolution—the practice spread to areas where anarchists were present, including France. Following his release from a five-year sentence for counterfeiting, Gallo settled in Nancy, where he founded the city's first anarchist group. Shortly after, he moved to Paris, where he obtained a firearm and acid. On 5 March 1886, Gallo entered the Paris Stock Exchange, a symbol of capitalism in France, and threw his explosive, which failed to detonate. He then began firing at the people present, aiming at the government bond trading area. The bomb didn't explode, and all five shots he fired missed his intended targets, though they did slightly injure a broker's leg with a ricochet.

The anarchist was arrested and sentenced to deportation to a penal colony, where he died in 1923, 37 years later. During his trial, debates raged within the anarchist movement in France, particularly concerning Jean Grave, who was in charge of the publication Le Révolté. Grave refused to publish Gallo's defense in the anarchist newspaper. In the following years, anarchist attacks in France continued, notably during the anarchist bombing campaign of 1888-1889 and the Ère des attentats (1892–1894).

== History ==
=== Context ===
In the 19th century, anarchism emerged and took shape in Europe before spreading. Anarchists advocate a struggle against all forms of domination perceived as unjust including economic domination brought forth by capitalism. They are particularly opposed to the State, seen as the organization that legitimizes a good number of these dominations through its police, army and propaganda.

In the late 1870s, anarchists developed the strategy of propaganda by the deed, aiming to convey anarchist ideas directly through action, without relying on discourse. Figures in the anarchist movement such as Peter Kropotkin, Errico Malatesta, Andrea Costa, Carlo Cafiero and especially Johann Most extensively developed this strategy. In 1879, it was adopted by the congress of the Jura Federation in La Chaux-de-Fonds. In 1880, it was discussed in Vevey during a meeting that produced a Charter of propaganda by the deed, which was adopted the following year by the first exclusively anarchist congress in France, the Paris congress, in May 1881. It would gain renewed centrality at the International Congress in London in July 1881.

In 1881, the first attack of this nature in France, the Thiers statue bombing, failed to destroy the statue of Adolphe Thiers it was targeting. In the years that followed, this practice became widespread within anarchist circles in France, especially as repression from the French state intensified, leading to a dynamic of revenge on the part of the anarchists.

=== Preparation ===
In parallel with these developments, Charles Gallo, a man from a poor background, was released in 1885 after serving a five-year prison sentence. He had been convicted in 1880 for counterfeiting money to buy food. Following his release, he found a job in Nancy and joined the anarchist movement, where he founded the city's first anarchist group, which met at his home.

Gallo suddenly left Nancy on 16 February 1886, and traveled to Paris. He obtained a revolver from a friend, as well as prussic acid, and began to make preparations. The anarchist, who was a proponent of propaganda of the deed, sought to target France's political and financial leaders. He first considered attacking the hall in the Palace of Versailles where the French Congress met when in session, and then the Chamber of Deputies directly, but abandoned these plans for fear of not being able to carry out his action successfully. He finally settled on the Paris Stock Exchange, a target he perceived as easier to access and as a gathering place for French capitalists.

After settling into a hotel on Mouffetard street, Charles Gallo began to build a bomb. He told the hotel owner he was conducting chemistry experiments in his room, but assured him that he could inspect it at any time to see that it was in perfect condition. No one visited him except for an unknown man who was seen by other guests and the owner. This man was described as well-dressed and spoke with Gallo in a foreign language that they weren't able to understand or identify.

=== Attack ===
On 5 March 1886, Gallo entered the building with his homemade acid bomb and a revolver. He made his way to the lodges and, around 3 P.M., threw the bomb at the bankers gathered there. The device failed to explode due to a flaw in its construction, instead leaking its contents onto the floor and emitting a foul odor.

As a panic ensued, with people realizing the seeping liquid was dangerous, Gallo began to fire at the 'coulisse de rente'—the unofficial stock market where traders exchanged government bonds among themselves. He fired five shots, all of which missed their targets and lodged in the walls before brokers and bankers rushed him, beating him with their canes. One of the shots slightly injured a trader in the thigh, but no one else was hit. Police officers arrived to arrest him and were also beaten by the mob in the commotion.

=== Aftermath, trial, and internal conflicts within the anarchist movement ===
When police searched him, they found eight cartridges for his weapon and numerous anarchist or revolutionary newspapers, such as Le Drapeau noir ('The Black Flag'), La Lutte ('The Struggle'), and Le Cri du Peuple ('The Cry of the People'), along with leaflets from La Bataille ('The Battle') and the latest book by Peter Kropotkin. Immediately after his arrest, he was questioned about his motives and declared he was an anarchist seeking to 'scare the bourgeois'. He also gave a false identity, claiming to be named Petrovich and to be from Switzerland.

Following his attack, Gallo was regarded as a hero of the anarchist cause by a significant number of anarchists in France. However, when he sought to publish his defense in Le Révolté, the newspaper of Kropotkin and Jean Grave-a publication that had previously theorized propaganda of the deed in the years 1878–1880 before gradually moving away from it-Grave refused to let him. This led to intense debates within the anarchist movement in France that would continue in the following years with the categorical refusal to defend Pini and even Ravachol, at first, in the newspaper. French intelligence services wrote about this :

A large number of anarchist groups are more than unhappy with the attitude taken by Le Révolté towards the author of the Paris Stock Exchange attack. [...] Not only has the newspaper never spoken of Gallo, but it had also very bluntly refused to publish the defense he wrote in his cell at Mazas, as well as the biographical note written by Louiche that was supposed to be placed at the beginning of Gallo's text.

During his trial, he protested against the authorities and shouted, among other things, 'Long live the social revolution! Long live anarchy! Death to the bourgeois judiciary! Long live dynamite!', which led to him being forcibly removed from the courtroom. An expert analysis of his explosive device confirmed that the only reason it did not explode was a design flaw on Gallo's part; otherwise, the attack would have been far more deadly. The anarchist complained that he had not been able to kill or touch more targets and clearly stated that he had undertaken this action as an act of propaganda of the deed, seeking to spread the anarchist ideology and directly target capitalists through this act.

He was sentenced to 20 years of deportation to a penal colony.

== Bibliography ==
- Bouhey, Vivien (2008), Les Anarchistes contre la République [The Anarchists against the Republic] (in French), Rennes: Presses universitaires de Rennes (PUR)
- Dupuy, Rolf (2025), "GALLO, Charles, Auguste", Dictionnaire international des militants anarchistes, Paris
- Eisenzweig, Uri (2001). Fictions de l'anarchisme [Fictions of anarchism] (in French). France: C. Bourgois. ISBN 2-267-01570-6.
- Jourdain, Edouard (2013). L'anarchisme [Anarchism]. Paris: La Découverte. ISBN 978-2-7071-9091-8.
- Ward, Colin (2004). Anarchism: A Very Short Introduction. Oxford University Press (OUP).
