= Bernard Faucon =

French photographer and writer

- Born: 12 September 1950
- Occupation: Photographer, writer, visual artist
- Website: www.bernardfaucon.fr

Bernard Faucon (born 12 September 1950) is a French photographer and writer. He first established a career in art photography and has exhibited widely around the world. Some of his work has attracted accusations of promoting pedophilia, which he rejected as "a loss of open-mindedness" ("la perte de l'esprit libre") in a 2005 interview. In 2024, the French daily Le Monde published accusations from three men who alleged having suffered "sexual violence" at his hands as adolescent muses for his photography.

== Biography ==
Faucon was born in Apt, in Provence, southern France. He attended the lycée in Apt, then studied at the Sorbonne, graduating in Philosophy in 1973. Until 1977 he worked as a fine art painter, and thereafter discovered photography.

His photographic work expresses a love of youth and dreamy beauty, using saturated colour, natural settings, rooms, and often tableaux of mannequins. His major photographic series are, in date-order: Les Grandes Vacances (1977–1981); Evolution probable du Temps (1981–1984); Les Chambres d'amour (1987–1989); Les Idoles et les Sacrifices (1989–1991); Les écritures (1991–1993); and La Fin de L'image (1993–1995).

Faucon has won numerous awards from his work, including the Grand Prix National (1989) and the Prix Leonard de Vinci (1991). Since 1977 he has had nearly 300 solo exhibitions, many held outside France. He developed a popular following in Japan in particular.

In 1997 Faucon decided to cease his photography practice. In 1999 he published his first book of writing, La peur du voyage (The Fear of Travel). He is represented by the French agency Agence Vu.

The mannequins which he had frequently used in his photographs were acquired by the Nanasai Company and are held in its corporate art collection in Kyoto, Japan. In 2002, the Moscow House of Photography in Russia held a Bernard Faucon Festival. Two years later, he was invited to open the Moscow Biennale.

== Books and films ==
Almost all of Faucon's photography books have been published in France or Japan. The most recent and most available retrospective of his photographs is Jours d'Image, 1977-1995. Most of his books are out-of-print.

A documentary about him was made, entitled Bernard Faucon: Fables (1992), directed by Jean Real. It is a 44-minute film.

Les grandes vacances, une vie de Bernard Faucon (2009) directed by Camille Ponsin and written by Arthur Dreyfus, is displayed as a permanent exhibition in the Museum of Contemporary Art Chengdu, which was inaugurated in the same year.

== Critical essays ==
- Guy Davenport. "The Illuminations of Bernard Faucon" (IN: The Georgia Review, Winter 2002).
