= Claire Dorland-Clauzel =

French businesswoman

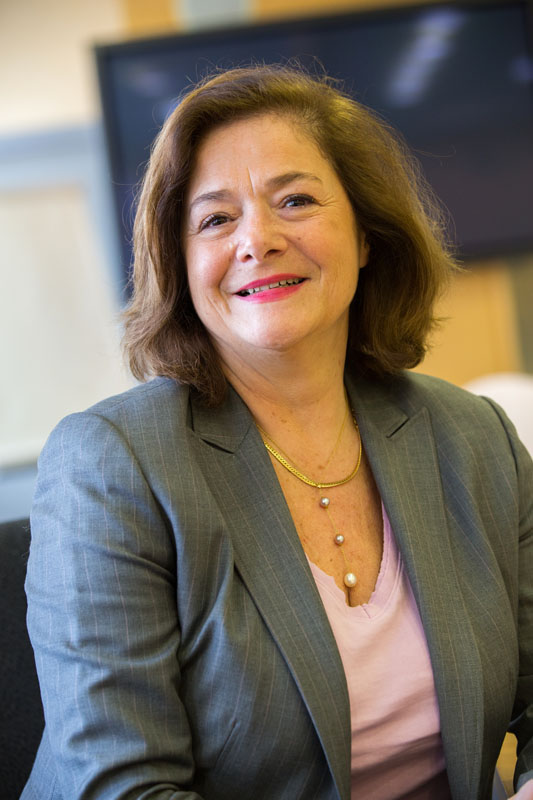
Claire Dorland-Clauzel

Claire Dorland-Clauzel (born 15 November 1954 in Rennes, France) is a French businesswoman. From 2008 to 2018 she was the executive vice president of Michelin’s brands, sustainable development, The Michelin Guide and external relations. She also was a member of the Group’s Executive Committee.

== Biography ==
Claire Dorland-Clauzel studied khâgne at the lycée Henri-IV and obtained a master in History at La Sorbonne. She also obtained a doctorate in Geography at the Paris institute of Géographie and is an alumnus of the école nationale d’administration (class of 1988).

Claire Dorland-Clauzel started her career in the French public administration in 1988, at the department of treasury, in charge of foreign investments operating in France. In 1993, she took the lead of Christian Noyer's cabinet when he was promoted head of the department of treasury and she also became deputy CFO to French steel-maker Usinor. From 1995 to 1997, she became the chief of staff for the director of the treasury department, and joined Jean Arthuis’ cabinet as a technical advisor when he became minister of the economy. In 1997, she was the head of life and health insurance office of the treasury department.

=== Axa ===
In 1998, Claire Dorland-Clauzel joined the insurance company AXA as the head of the audit and control department, and became a member of the executive committee. In 2000, she became AXA France’s head of support functions, and in 2003, she was appointed to head of communications and sustainable development. She also shifted from being a member of AXA France’ executive committee to being a member of the group’s committee.

=== Michelin ===
In 2008, Claire Dorland-Clauzel joined French pneumatic manufacturer Michelin as head of communications and member of Michelin's board of directors. In 2009, she managed Michelin’s first worldwide communications campaign. In June 2012, she was also given the supervision of public affairs, Michelin Lifestyle and Michelin Travel Partner, which made her the supervisor of the Michelin Guide, which she says is a crucial component of Michelin’s “brand content” strategy to communicate on the quality of the products it caters to its customers. In December 2014, she was appointed executive vice president of Michelin’s brands and external relations.

She oversaw the publication of five new Michelin guides about cities in Asia and America between 2014 and 2017, including the first Michelin guide on China in 2016 with one guide dedicated to the city of Shanghai.

From March 13, 2017 to 2018 she also was in charge of sustainable development and mobility for the Michelin group. In this role, she supervises the organization of Movin'On, a global conference on sustainable mobility which picks up the baton from the Michelin Challenge Bibendum event.

The first edition took place in June 2017 in Montreal, Canada. Michelin presented “Vision”, a concept wheel and tire that is airless, smart, uses 100% biodegradable bio-based materials and 3D printing.

In February 2018, she announced her departure from Michelin, to run a wine business, le « Château La Tuilière » in the Bordeaux wine-growing region.

== Awards ==
- Chevalier of the National Order of Merit
- Chevalier of the Legion of Honour
