= Charles Gallo =

French teacher and Christian anarchist (1859–1923)

- Born: February 7, 1859; Le Palais, France
- Died: September 23, 1923; Penal colony of New Caledonia
- Citizenship: France
- Occupations: Teacher, worker, clerk
- Movement: Anarchism

Charles Gallo (1859–1923) was a French teacher, typographer, employee, and Christian anarchist. He is best known for committing the Paris Stock Exchange bombing, one of the first anarchist propaganda of the deed attacks in France.

Born into a very poor family and abandoned by his mother, Gallo held various jobs, including assistant schoolmaster and bailiff's clerk. He was arrested around the age of 20 for counterfeiting money to buy food. Sentenced to five years in prison, he converted to Protestantism there and, upon his release, he joined the anarchist movement in France. He settled in Nancy, where he founded the city's first anarchist group before moving to Paris a short time later, where he acquired a firearm and acid. On 5 March 1886, Gallo entered the Paris Stock Exchange, a symbol of capitalism in France, and threw his explosive, which failed to detonate. He then began firing at the people present, aiming at the government bond trading area. The bomb didn't explode, and all five shots he fired missed his intended targets, though they did slightly injure a broker's leg with a ricochet.

His trial caused conflicts within the anarchist movement as Jean Grave refused to publish his defense in the newspaper he controlled, Le Révolté. He was sentenced to 20 years of deportation to a penal colony after a tumultuous trial during which he complained that he had not been able to touch more capitalists in his action. He was deported to the penal colony in New Caledonia, where he fought with a guard and struck him twice in the stomach with a pickaxe in September 1887. The guards shot him, and he received two bullets to the head, surviving with significant after-effects. For this event, he was condemned to death, but his sentence was commuted to life deportation. He was subsequently regularly placed in solitary confinement and in the penal colony's asylum by the concentrationary authorities.

Around 1900–1901, Gallo managed to contact the anarchist press, describing a terrible situation and declaring himself moved by the political visions of Leo Tolstoy. A companion described him as a 'living corpse' in 1902. This was his last mention in the anarchist press until his death in 1923.

== Biography ==
=== Youth and first jobs ===
Charles Auguste Gallo was born on 7 February 1859, in Le Palais, Morbihan. He was abandoned by his mother at a young age and was raised by others who took him in. Gallo, who came from a very poor family, was a diligent student. He went on to become an assistant school teacher, then a bailiff's clerk, and an employee.

=== Incarceration and integration into the anarchist movement ===
In 1879, he was arrested for counterfeiting. Although the case involved a small production he used for his own food needs, he was sentenced to five years in prison. During his prison term, he converted to Protestantism.

In 1885, following his release, he left Rouen and went to Nancy, where a 'patron' had found him a job as a typographer. He began to lean toward the Radical Party before joining the anarchist movement.

Authorities noted that he was a diligent student, going to the library daily and acquiring numerous political books; he was said to have often spoken about Kropotkin. The anarchist was a solitary person and knew several languages in addition to French, including English and German—he also learned Hebrew. Gallo founded a group of about ten workers called the Cercle d'études sociales de Nancy ('Social Studies Circle of Nancy')—the first anarchist group in the city—which met at his home. During that year, he also sheltered an anarchist who was on the run from the police.

The anarchist was reported to authorities by his 'patron', whom he visited in Rouen at the end of the year and to whom he confided in a plot to attack the Chamber of Deputies, though he claimed to be opposed to it. The patron then wrote to the prefecture, stating that Gallo was 'leaning more and more toward anarchism'.

=== Paris Stock Exchange bombing ===
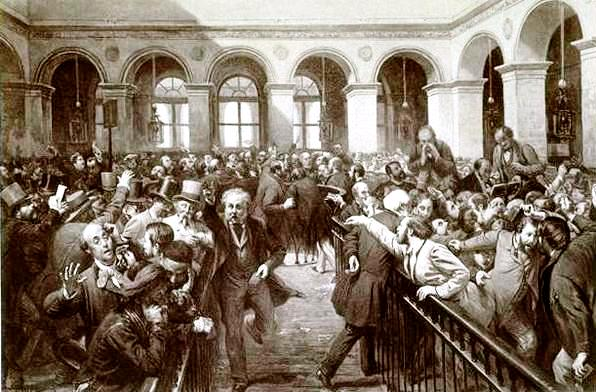
Romanced depiction of the Paris Stock Exchange bombing in the press of the time

Back in Nancy, Gallo suddenly left the city on 16 February 1886, and traveled to Paris. He obtained a revolver from a friend, as well as prussic acid, and began to make preparations. The anarchist, who was a proponent of propaganda of the deed, sought to target France's political and financial leaders. He first considered attacking the hall in the Palace of Versailles where the French Congress met when in session, and then the Chamber of Deputies directly, but abandoned these plans for fear of not being able to carry out his action successfully. He finally settled on the Paris Stock Exchange, a target he perceived as easier to access and as a gathering place for French capitalists.

After settling into a hotel on Mouffetard street, Charles Gallo began to build a bomb. He told the hotel owner he was conducting chemistry experiments in his room, but assured him that he could inspect it at any time to see that it was in perfect condition. No one visited him except for an unknown man who was seen by other guests and the owner. This man was described as well-dressed and spoke with Gallo in a foreign language.

On 5 March 1886, Gallo entered the building with his homemade acid bomb and a revolver. He made his way to the lodges and, around 3 P.M., threw the bomb at the bankers gathered there. The device failed to explode due to a flaw in its construction, instead leaking its contents onto the floor and emitting a foul odor.

As a panic ensued, with people realizing the seeping liquid was dangerous, Gallo began to fire at the 'coulisse de rente'—the unofficial stock market where traders exchanged government bonds among themselves. He fired five shots, all of which missed their targets and lodged in the walls before brokers and bankers rushed him, beating him with their canes. One of the shots slightly injured a trader in the thigh, but no one else was hit. Police officers arrived to arrest him and were also beaten by the mob in the commotion.

When police searched him, they found eight cartridges for his weapon and numerous anarchist or revolutionary newspapers, such as Le Drapeau noir ('The Black Flag'), La Lutte ('The Strugge'), and Le Cri du Peuple ('The Cry of the People'), along with leaflets from La Bataille ('The Battle') and the latest book by Peter Kropotkin. Immediately after his arrest, he was questioned about his motives and declared he was an anarchist seeking to 'scare the bourgeois'. He also gave a false identity, claiming to be named Petrovich and to be from Switzerland.

=== Trial and conflict with Jean Grave ===
Following his attack, Gallo was regarded as a hero of the anarchist cause by a significant number of anarchists in France. However, when he sought to publish his defense in Le Révolté, the newspaper of Kropotkin and Jean Grave-a publication that had previously theorized propaganda of the deed in the years 1878–1880 before gradually moving away from it-Grave refused to let him. This led to intense debates within the anarchist movement in France that would continue in the following years with the categorical refusal to defend Pini and even Ravachol, at first, in the newspaper. French intelligence services wrote about this :

A large number of anarchist groups are more than unhappy with the attitude taken by Le Révolté towards the author of the Paris Stock Exchange attack. [...] Not only has the newspaper never spoken of Gallo, but it had also very bluntly refused to publish the defense he wrote in his cell at Mazas, as well as the biographical note written by Louiche that was supposed to be placed at the beginning of Gallo's text.

During his trial, he protested against the authorities and shouted, among other things, 'Long live the social revolution! Long live anarchy! Death to the bourgeois judiciary! Long live dynamite!', which led to him being forcibly removed from the courtroom. An expert analysis of his explosive device confirmed that the only reason it did not explode was a design flaw on Gallo's part; otherwise, the attack would have been far more deadly. The anarchist complained that he had not been able to kill or touch more targets and clearly stated that he had undertaken this action as an act of propaganda of the deed, seeking to spread the anarchist ideology and directly target capitalists through this act.

He was sentenced to 20 years of deportation to a penal colony.

=== Deportation, repression, final years ===
He was deported to New Caledonia in December 1886 and arrived there in March 1887. In September of the same year, Gallo fought with a guard at the penal colony and struck him twice in the stomach with a pickaxe. The guards shot him, and he took two bullets to the head but survived. He was sentenced to death for this action, a penalty that was commuted to life deportation in 1888.

According to a letter that was published in Le Révolté, he lost much of his ability to speak after this event, as his tongue and jaw were paralyzed. In 1894–1895, the penal colony authorities placed him in the camp's asylum and in solitary confinement for long periods.

Around 1900–1901, he managed to contact Parisian anarchists and sent several letters to Paris, to Temps Nouveaux, Grave's new newspaper. In these letters, Gallo wrote about the situation in the penal colony and his political views. He described himself as a 'non-Catholic Christian anarchist' and wrote about Leo Tolstoy, who was associated with Christian anarchism:

The father or founder of the new literary and socialist school in Russia has always inspired me; since I have known him, I have felt the most vivid and profound sympathy. His admirable understanding of our era and its needs, his love for the poor and oppressed, and his drive for justice and progress have more than once brought tears of enthusiasm to my eyes.

In 1902, a companion described him as nothing more than a 'living corpse'. This was the last mention of Gallo in the anarchist press. He died on 23 September 1923 at the penal colony on Nou island.

== Bibliography ==
- Bouhey, Vivien (2008), Les Anarchistes contre la République [The Anarchists against the Republic] (in French), Rennes: Presses universitaires de Rennes (PUR)
- Dupuy, Rolf; Gallet, Laurent (2024), GALLO Charles, Paris: Le Maitron
- Dupuy, Rolf (2025), "GALLO, Charles, Auguste", Dictionnaire international des militants anarchistes, Paris
