= Étienne Borne =

French philosopher

Étienne Vincent Borne (French: [etjɛn vɛ̃sɑ̃ bɔʁn]; January 22, 1907 – June 14, 1993) was born in Manduel (Gard). He was a professor of philosophy Hypokhâgne at Lycée Henri-IV in Paris, and taught briefly at the University of São Paulo. Étienne Borne founded the Mouvement republicain populaire (MRP), and the French Christian Democratic Party. He was a columnist in the newspaper La Croix. Jacques Derrida was one of his students.

He died in La Celle-Saint-Cloud.
