= École nationale d'administration =

French former grande école

Coordinates: 48°34′50″N 7°44′14″E

- Type: Public graduate school, grande école
- Active: 1945–2021 (replaced by the Institut national du service public)
- Founders: Charles de Gaulle and Michel Debré
- Academic affiliations: TPC
- Budget: €43.98 million
- President: Jean-Marc Sauvé
- Director: Patrick Gérard
- Administrative staff: 229
- Postgraduates: 533 students
- Location: Strasbourg and Paris, France
- Colors: Blue, white
- Website: www.ena.fr

The École nationale d'administration (French pronunciation: [ekɔl nɑsjɔnal dadministʁɑsjɔ̃]; ENA; English: National School of Administration) was a French grande école, created in 1945 by the then provisional chief of government Charles de Gaulle and principal co-author of the 1958 Constitution Michel Debré, to democratize access to the senior civil service. The school was frequently criticized from the 1970s onward for having built an incredibly elitist culture as well as being a stronghold for technocrats. As a result, it was dissolved on 31 December 2021 and replaced by the Institut national du service public (INSP).

The ENA selected and supervised the initial training of senior French officials. It was considered to be one of the most academically demanding French schools, both because of its low acceptance rates and because a large majority of its candidates had already graduated from other elite schools in the country such as Sciences Po or the École Polytechnique. Thus, within French society, the ENA stood as one of the main pathways to high positions in the public and private sectors. Indeed, 4 Presidents of France from the beginning of the 5th Republic in 1958 to the present day (including Emmanuel Macron) and many prime-ministers and ministers, studied at the ENA.

Originally located in Paris, it had been relocated to Strasbourg in order to emphasize its European character. It was based in the former Commanderie Saint-Jean, though continued to maintain a Paris campus. ENA produced around 80 to 90 graduates every year, known as étudiants-fonctionnaires, "enaos" or "énarques" (IPA: [enaʁk]). In 2002 the Institut international d'administration publique (IIAP) which educated French diplomats under a common structure with the ENA was merged with it. The ENA shares several traditions with the College of Europe, which was established shortly after.

In 2019, President Emmanuel Macron announced he would propose to abolish and replace the ENA. Macron is an ENA graduate himself, but the tight network of ENA graduates influencing the French civil service has been decried by populist protests such as the yellow vests movement as an elite governing class out of touch with the lower social classes. In April 2021, Macron confirmed the closure of the school, calling the closure "the most important reform of the senior public service" since the school's creation in 1945.

== History ==
=== Founding ===
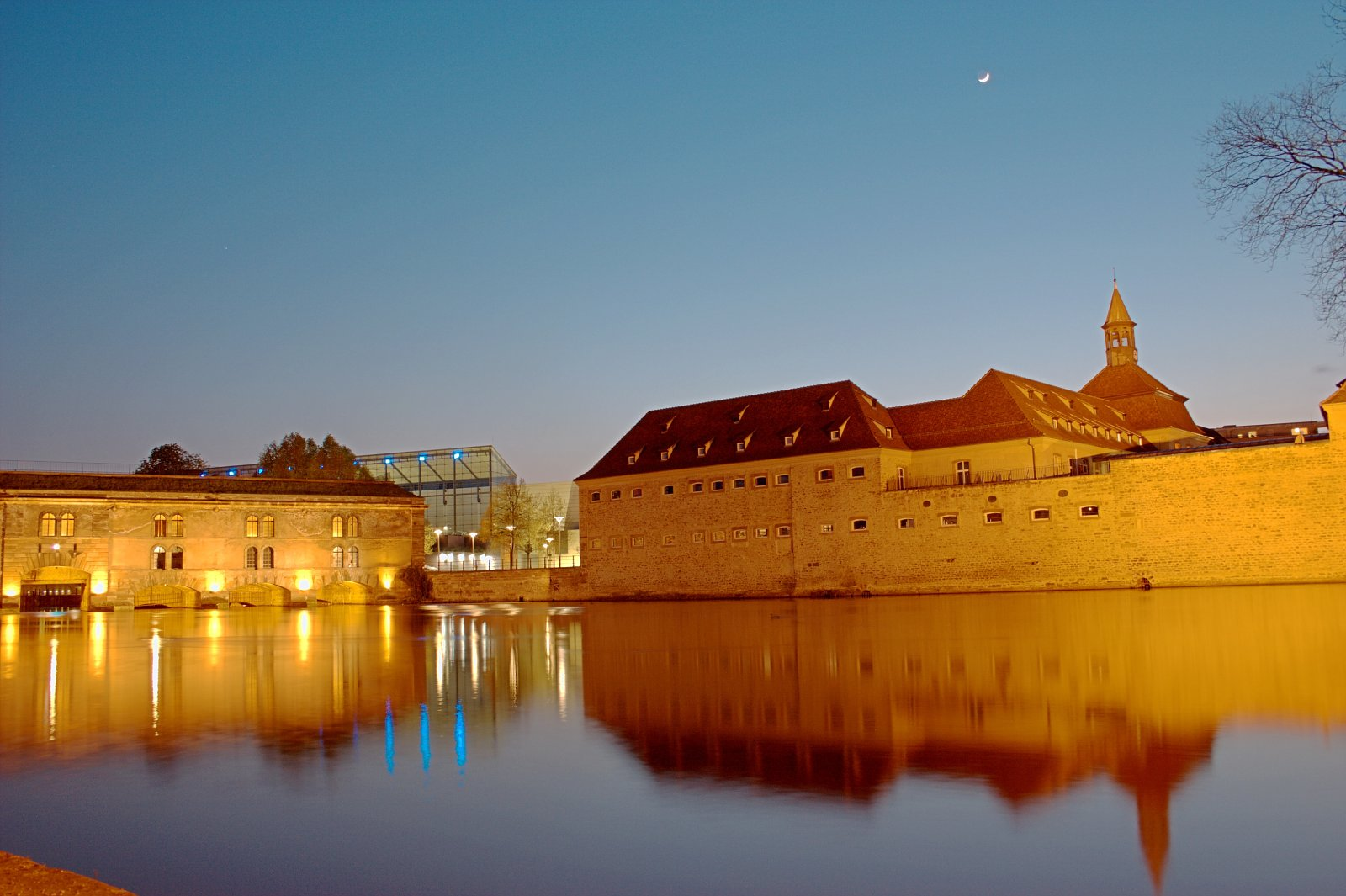
The Commanderie Saint-Jean, home of the École nationale d'administration

The École Nationale d'Administration was formally established in October 1945 at the decree of Michel Debré as part of his project to reform the recruitment and training of high-ranking officials.

The ENA was designed to democratize access to the higher ranks of the French civil service. Until then, each ministry had its own hiring process and selection standards. The examinations for particular ministries were often extremely specialized, meaning that few candidates possessed the knowledge to pass. In addition, the narrow expertise required meant few officials were capable of serving in a variety of roles.

The school was designed to broaden and standardize the training provided to senior public servants, and to ensure they possessed extensive knowledge of policy and governance. Debré's stated intention was to create "a body of officials proven to be highly competent, especially in financial, economic and social matters." The new system, based on academic proficiency and competitive examination, was also intended to guard against nepotism and make recruitment to top positions more transparent.

Access to senior positions of the French civil service is threefold: first, through generalist civil service positions; second, through "technical" (engineering) positions; and third, through internal promotion.

=== Relocation to Strasbourg ===
In November 1991 the government of Prime Minister Édith Cresson announced that the ENA would be relocated to Strasbourg. The Commanderie Saint-Jean, a former barracks and prison dating back to the 14th century, was chosen as its new site. The move was designed to emphasize the school's symbolic proximity to the numerous European institutions based in the city. However, though the school was officially relocated, it maintained many of its facilities in Paris. It remained split between the two cities, requiring students to complete studies in both locations, until it was fully re-located to Strasbourg in January 2005.

In 2002, it was merged with its sister institution the Institut international d'administration publique (IIAP), called the "foreigners' ENA", with the aim of increasing its international profile.

=== Closure ===
In April 2019, it was claimed that a leaked speech to be delivered by French President Macron would announce that ENA would be closed as part of the solution to the Gilets Jaunes crisis. On 25 April 2019, President Emmanuel Macron confirmed that he will close ENA. In April 2021, Macron announced the closure of the school, calling the closure "the most important reform of the senior public service" since the school's creation by Charles de Gaulle in 1945. In January 2022, it has been replaced by the Institut national du service public (INSP).

== Recruitment ==
Admission to the ENA is granted based on a competitive examination taking place from the end of August to November, which people generally take after completing studies at the Sciences Po or any Prép'Ena (preparatory classes for the ENA examination for people coming from universities or grandes écoles). The "concours externe" exam is divided into two parts:

The written part includes:

- An essay on public law;
- An essay on economics;
- An essay on a question about the role of public institutions and their relations with society
- A note de synthèse (analyzing a 25-page document and proposing a brief for a Senior Executive [Minister or Director]) on Social Law and Policies (Questions Sociales);
- Three questions on Public Finance.

The oral exam, taken only by those with the highest marks at the written exam, consists of:

- An oral examination on International Politics (Questions Internationales);
- An oral examination on Questions Européennes (European Law and Policies);
- An English oral test;
- A collective exam, simulating a case in management to assess interaction skills;
- A 45-minute entrance exam, known as Grand Oral since any question can be asked, based on the CV given by the candidate.

The results of this exam process are published by the end of December.

Other exam processes govern admission for career civil servants (concours interne) and for all other people, already active in business, political or union activities (troisième concours).

Following a two-year intensive programme combining high-responsibility internships and examinations, the ENA ranks students according to their results. Students are then asked, by order of merit, the position/body they want to join. Top-ranked students (between 12 and 15 students) usually join the so-called "grands corps" Inspection générale des finances, Conseil d'État or Cour des comptes, usually followed by the French Treasury and the diplomatic service. Other students will join various ministries and administrative justice or préfectures. To quote the ENA's site:

In fact, although these famous alumni are the most visible, the majority are largely unknown, lead quiet and useful careers in our civil service, and don't recognise themselves in the stereotyped images about our school.

== Promotions ==
Academic years at the ENA are known as promotions, and are named by the students after outstanding French people (Vauban, Saint-Exupéry, Rousseau), Foreigners (Mandela), characters (Cyrano de Bergerac), battles (Valmy), concepts (Croix de Lorraine, Droits de l'homme) or values (liberté-égalité-fraternité).

This tradition comes from old French military academies such as the Ecole Spéciale Militaire de Saint-Cyr.

The Promotion Voltaire of 1980 has attracted particular attention, since numerous graduates that year went on to become significant figures in French politics. François Hollande, Dominique de Villepin, Ségolène Royal, Renaud Donnedieu de Vabres and Michel Sapin were all members of this promotion.

== Ranking ==
In 2011, the Mines ParisTech: Professional Ranking of World Universities ranked the ENA third in France and ninth in the world according to the number of alumni holding the position of CEO at Fortune Global 500 companies.

In 2013, a Times Higher Education ranking that ordered universities according to the same metric placed the ENA sixth in the world.

== Alumni ==
Few énarques (around 1%) actually get involved in politics. Most ENA alumni hold neutral, technical, and administrative positions in the French civil service. Researchers at the Centre national de la recherche scientifique have shown that many ENA alumni become business executives in France.

French law makes it relatively easy for civil servants to enter politics: civil servants who are elected or appointed to a political position do not have to resign their position in the civil service; instead, they are put in a situation of "temporary leave" known as disponibilité. If they are not re-elected or reappointed, they may ask for their reintegration into their service (well-known examples include Lionel Jospin and Philippe Séguin). In addition, ENA graduates are often recruited as aides by government ministers and other politicians; this makes it easier for some of them to enter a political career. As an example, Dominique de Villepin entered politics as an appointed official, after serving as an aide to Jacques Chirac, without ever having held an elected position. The ENA also participates in international Technical Assistance programmes, funded by the EU or other donors.

Since its creation 60 years ago, the ENA has trained 5600 French senior officials and 2600 foreigners. Some famous alumni include:

- Head of state: Valéry Giscard d'Estaing (France), Jacques Chirac (France), François Hollande (France), Emmanuel Macron (France), Nicéphore Soglo (Benin), Adly Mansour (Egypt, acting), Paul Biya (Cameroon)
- Head of government: Jean Castex (France), Édouard Philippe (France), Laurent Fabius (France), Michel Rocard (France), Édouard Balladur (France), Alain Juppé (France), Lionel Jospin (France), Dominique de Villepin (France), Edem Kodjo (Togo), Alfred Sant (Malta), André Milongo (Republic of the Congo), Patrick Leclercq (Monaco), Jean-Paul Proust (Monaco), Brigi Rafini (Niger).
- Industry leaders: Guillaume Pepy (CEO of SNCF), Michel Bon (former CEO of Carrefour and France Telecom), Jean-Marie Messier, Ernest-Antoine Seillière, Louis Schweitzer, Gunnar Graef (former CEO of Deutsche Post, France), Philippe Heim (CEO of La Banque Postale, France), Gérard Mestrallet, Louis Gallois (former CEO of EADS), Henri de Castries (former CEO of Axa), Baudouin Prot, Frédéric Oudéa, Frédéric Lemoine, Pierre-André de Chalendar (CEO of Saint-Gobain), Claire Dorland-Clauzel.
- Current French ministers: Jean Castex (Prime Minister), Florence Parly and Bruno Le Maire.
- Former French ministers: Édouard Philippe (former Prime Minister), Michel Sapin or Ségolène Royal (typically one-third of every French cabinet since the 1960s and one-half of the Cabinet for recent administrations until Sarkozy's were alumni of the ENA).
- Other political leaders: Pavel Fischer (Ambassador of the Czech Republic to France 2003–2010, Czech presidential candidate 2018, ended third), Milos Alcalay (Venezuelan diplomat), Tea Tsulukiani (Minister of Justice of Georgia), Marcin Korolec (Minister of Environment, Poland), French left-wing: Jean-Pierre Chevènement, Élisabeth Guigou, Christian Paul, French right-wing: Laurent Wauquiez, Jean-François Copé, Valérie Pécresse, French far-right: François Asselineau, Florian Philippot.
- International organisations presidents: Pascal Lamy (WTO), Jean-Claude Trichet (ECB), Michel Camdessus (IMF), Jacques de Larosière (IMF and EBRD), Pierre Moscovici (European Commissioner).
- Intellectuals: Françoise Chandernagor, Jean-François Deniau, Gabriel de Broglie, Jacques Attali.

== International cooperation ==
An agreement was signed in Paris on 16 October 2012 between the ENA and the Uzbek Academy of administration; it allows for cooperation in the modernization of state administration and improving skills of public servants in Uzbekistan. The first cooperation was due to begin in January 2013.

== Criticism ==
Critics have accused the ENA of educating a narrow ruling class who are prone to groupthink and averse to alternative perspectives. According to these critics, the ENA discourages its students from innovative thinking and pushes them to take conventional, middle-of-the-road positions. Peter Gumbel, a British academic, has claimed that France's grande école system, and especially the ENA, has the effect of perpetuating an intellectually brilliant yet out-of-touch ruling elite. Yannick Blanc, a former senior civil servant, has also suggested that énarques have often been too 'intellectually conformist'.

The ENA was indeed constantly criticized for being a school perpetuating social-economic inequalities, as only a very tiny portion of its students was coming from modest backgrounds (only around 6% of students were children of laborers for example).

Some French politicians such as Bruno Le Maire and François Bayrou proposed abolishing the ENA, a step that was ultimately taken by President Macron in 2021.

== See also ==
Other main French Grandes Écoles:

- Sciences Po Paris (IEP Paris)
- École Normale Supérieure (ENS)
- Université Paris-Dauphine (Dauphine)
- École Polytechnique (X)
- Centrale Paris, now Centrale Supélec (CS)
- École des ponts ParisTech (Ponts ParisTech)
- École des Mines de Paris (Mines ParisTech)
- École des Hautes Études Commerciales de Paris (HEC)
- École Supérieure des Sciences Économiques et Commerciales (ESSEC)
- École Supérieure de Commerce de Paris (ESCP)

Other prestigious universities in the world:

- Golden Triangle in the UK
- Ivy League in the US
- SKY in South Korea
- C9 League in China
- National Institutes of Technology in India
- Indian Institutes of Technology in India
