= Brainans =

Commune in Bourgogne-Franche-Comté, France

- Commune
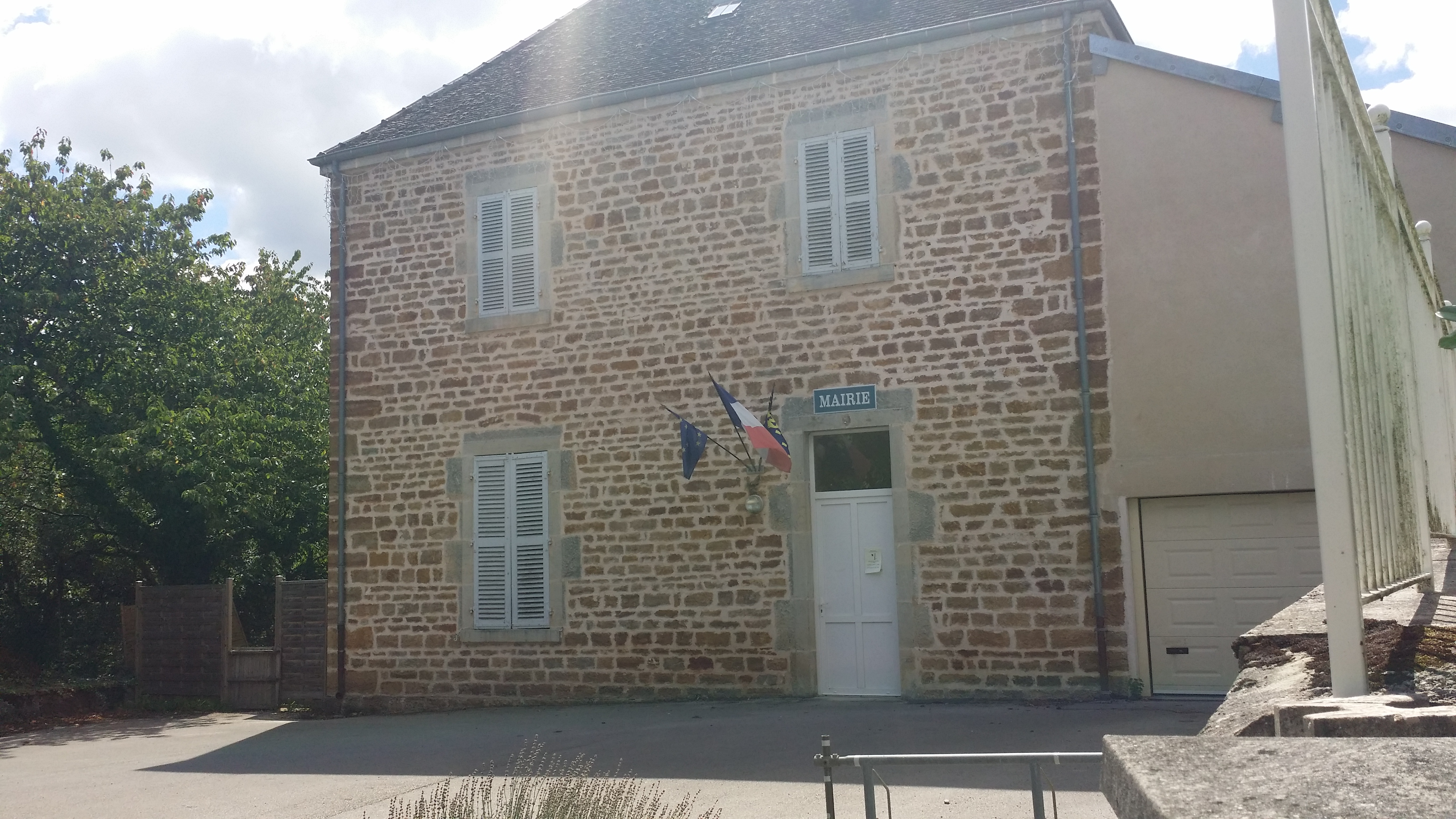
- The town hall in Brainans
- Location of Brainans
- Location within France Location within Bourgogne-Franche-Comté
- Coordinates: 46°52′17″N 5°37′28″E
- Country: France
- Region: Bourgogne-Franche-Comté
- Department: Jura
- Arrondissement: Dole
- Canton: Bletterans

Government
  - Mayor (2020–2026): Denis Breniaux
- Area^{1}: 7.07 km^{2} (2.73 sq mi)
- Highest elevation: 301 m (988 ft)
- Lowest elevation: 232 m (761 ft)
- Population (2023): 200
  - Density: 28/km^{2} (73/sq mi)
- Time zone: UTC+01:00 (CET)
  - Summer (DST): UTC+02:00 (CEST)
- INSEE/Postal code: 39073 /39800
- ^{1} French Land Register data, which excludes lakes, ponds, glaciers > 1 km^{2} (0.386 sq mi or 247 acres) and river estuaries.

Brainans (French pronunciation: [bʁɛnɑ̃]) is a commune in the Jura department in Bourgogne-Franche-Comté in eastern France.

== Population ==
Historical population
| Year | Pop. | ±% p.a. |
|---|---|---|
| 1968 | 162 | — |
| 1975 | 143 | −1.77% |
| 1982 | 129 | −1.46% |
| 1990 | 167 | +3.28% |
| 1999 | 166 | −0.07% |
| 2007 | 172 | +0.44% |
| 2012 | 161 | −1.31% |
| 2017 | 171 | +1.21% |
| 2023 | 200 | +2.65% |
Source: INSEE

== See also ==
- Communes of the Jura department
