= Arthur Dreyfus =

French journalist

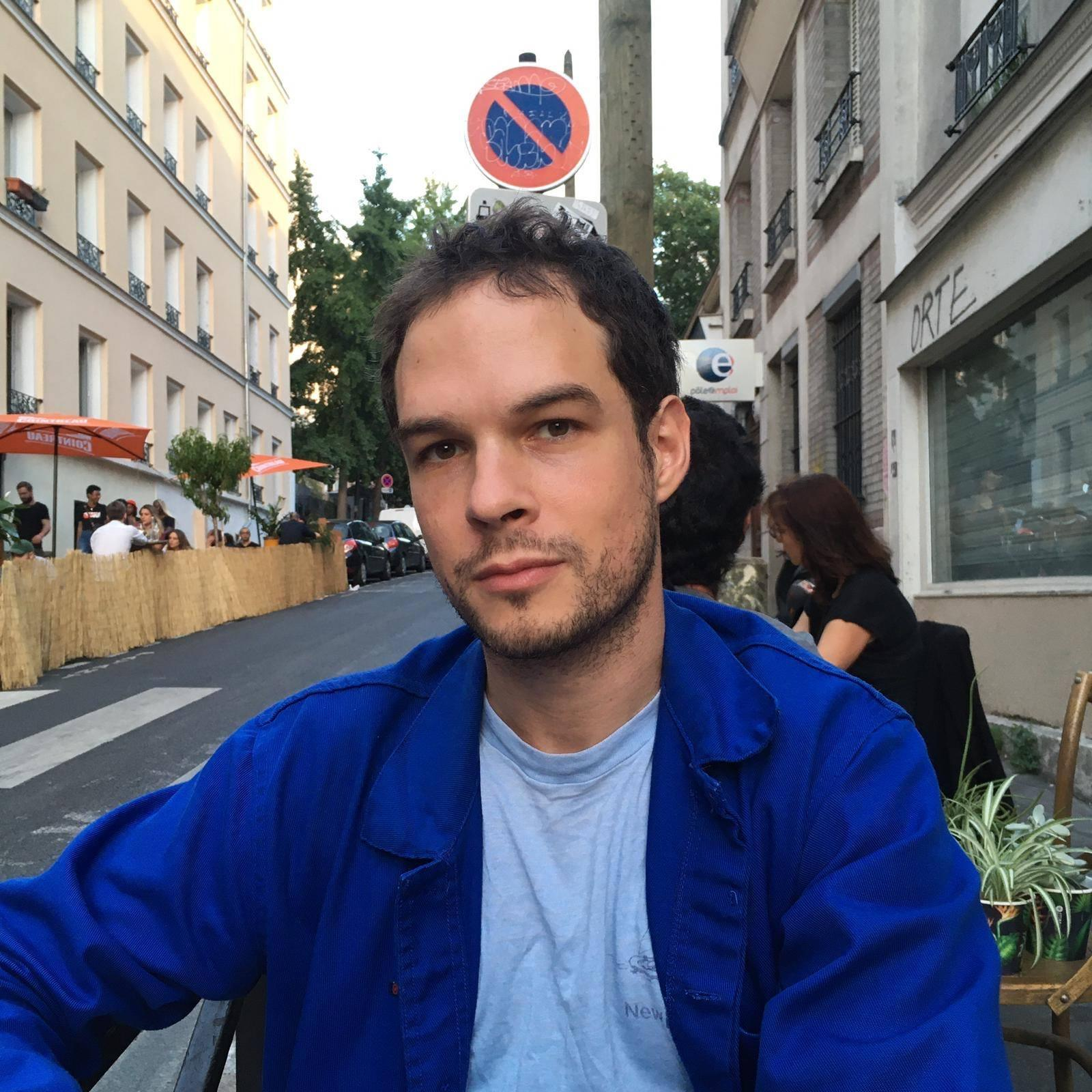
- Arthur Dreyfus in 2021
- Born: 4 June 1986 (age 40); Lyon, France
- Occupations: Writer, journalist, screenwriter and director
- Notable work: La Synthèse du camphre, Belle Famille, Histoire de ma sexualité, Sans Véronique

Arthur Dreyfus (born 4 June 1986 in Lyon), is a French-Swiss writer, journalist, screenwriter and director. He became known in 2009, the year he received the French Young Writer Prize for his short story Il Déserte (He Deserts).

== Biography ==
Dreyfus was born in Lyon to the writer Isabelle Kauffmann. He is of Jewish descent and his grandfather was deported to a concentration camp during the Holocaust. Dreyfus studied literature at Lycée Henri-IV, received a diploma from CELSA Paris and obtained master's degrees in marketing and communication from Sciences Po in 2012. After graduating, he wanted to be an actor and worked as a magician specializing in mentalism. He also appeared in commercials; performed magic shows for brands, aftershows and fashion shows; acted in the television show Famille d'accueil, and created a magic act in 2006 with the actor Jean-Claude Dreyfus at the Théâtre des Bouffes-Parisiens. In March 2013, Dreyfus set up a naked jogging event in front of the French senate in Paris to protest what he described as "ambient puritanism" (« puritanisme ambiant ») and "the legal crusade against children's literature" (« le procès fait à la littérature pour la jeunesse »). In 2016, he acted in Le Système du docteur Goudron, the third film by Noël Herpe.

== Journalism ==
As a journalist, Dreyfus has contributed to Le Figaro, Positif, Technikart, ArtPassions, Stiletto, Vogue, Tempura, Madame Figaro and Holiday Magazine. He specializes in major interviews with celebrities such as Carla Bruni, Catherine Deneuve, Neymar, Olivier Saillard, Jean-Paul Goude, Inès de la Fressange, Jane Fonda, Anna Karina and Xavier Veilhan. Dreyfus also writes opera programs, essays, art books and for luxury fashion brands such as Lancel, Mauboussin and Fendi.

In 2012, he wrote a weekly column in France 2's cultural program called Avant-premieres (Previews). Since 2014, he has been the French cultural correspondent for the talk show Plus on est de fous, plus on lit! (The more one is crazy, the more one reads!), hosted by Marie-Louise Arsenault and broadcast on Radio Canada. In December 2015, he produced a series of shows for France Culture about music and happiness. Since 2017, he has written the musical programs for the classical festival Sommets Musicaux de Gstaad.

=== At Canal + ===
During the 2016 season, alongside Augustin Trapenard, Dreyfus was one of the film critics on the show Le Cercle on Canal +. In 2018, he presented La séquence du spectateur (The spectator sequence) during Tchi Tcha, a film show on the channel.

== Photography ==
After practicing photography for years, Dreyfus presented his first exhibition, Nous sommes peut-être passés à côté d’une belle histoire... (We may have missed out on a beautiful story ...), in November 2017 at the Patrick Gutknecht Gallery in Paris. The exhibit was intended as a meditation on eternal and prolonged childhood. He used an iPhone to take the photos and Ilfochrome, a rare photographic process, to produce the prints.

In October 2019, the artist Joël Andrianomearisoa invited him to participate in a collaborative exhibit called ALMOST HOME hosted by the RX gallery in Paris. Dreyfus contributed photographs and a series of poems to the exhibit.

== Political Positions ==
Dreyfus was one of the artists invited by Gérard Collomb to support Emmanuel Macron during his visit to Lyon in February 2017. He later published a pro-Europe and anti-extremist letter addressing supporters of Marine Le Pen in May 2017.

In February 2019, after the Jewish cemetery in Quatzenheim, Alsace was desecrated with swastikas, Dreyfus published a poem against antisemitism on Facebook which was shared 29,000 times and read by children during a ceremony at the town.

== Publications ==
- Journal sexuel d'un garçon d'aujourd'hui, P.O.L, March 2021, ISBN 978-2818051795
- 82 jours à l'Armurier, in collaboration with Laurent Pernot, Colomiers, Mairie de Colomiers, 72 pages, January 2019, ISBN 978-2-90-851679-1
- Je ne sais rien de la Corée, Gallimard, October 2017, ISBN 2072718821
- Participation in the joint publication Qu'est-ce que la gauche ?, Fayard, 2017, ISBN 978-2213704586
- Sans Véronique, Gallimard, January 2017, ISBN 2072688876
- Correspondance indiscrète, with Dominique Fernandez, Grasset, February 2016, ISBN 2246858836
- 101 Robes, Flammarion et Les Arts Décoratifs, coffee-table book, Philippe Apeloig version, September 2015, ISBN 2081353113
- Enfances, adolescences : 5 nouvelles inédites, Librio littérature, June 2015, joint publication, ISBN 2290101664
- Histoire de ma sexualité, Paris, Gallimard, coll. « Blanche », January 2014, ISBN 978-2070143986
- Beau repaire : Jacques Higelin reçoit, Paris, Actes Sud, joint publication, November 2013, ISBN 979-1091489102
- Noël, quel bonheur !, Paris, Armand Colin, 2012, joint publication, ISBN 978-2200283223
- Belle famille, Paris, Gallimard, coll. « Blanche », 2012, 244 pages, ISBN 978-2-07-013653-7
- Le Livre qui rend heureux, ill. by François Xavier Goby, Paris, Flammarion, 2011, 122 pages, ISBN 978-2-08-126633-9.
- La Synthèse du camphre, Paris, Gallimard, coll. Blanche, 2010, 253 pages, ISBN 978-2-07-012736-8
- Il déserte, short story in the eponymous volume, Buchet/Chastel, Paris 2009, joint publication of the winners of the Young Writer's Prize, ISBN 978-2283023860
