= Société Centrale des Banques de Province =

Former French bank

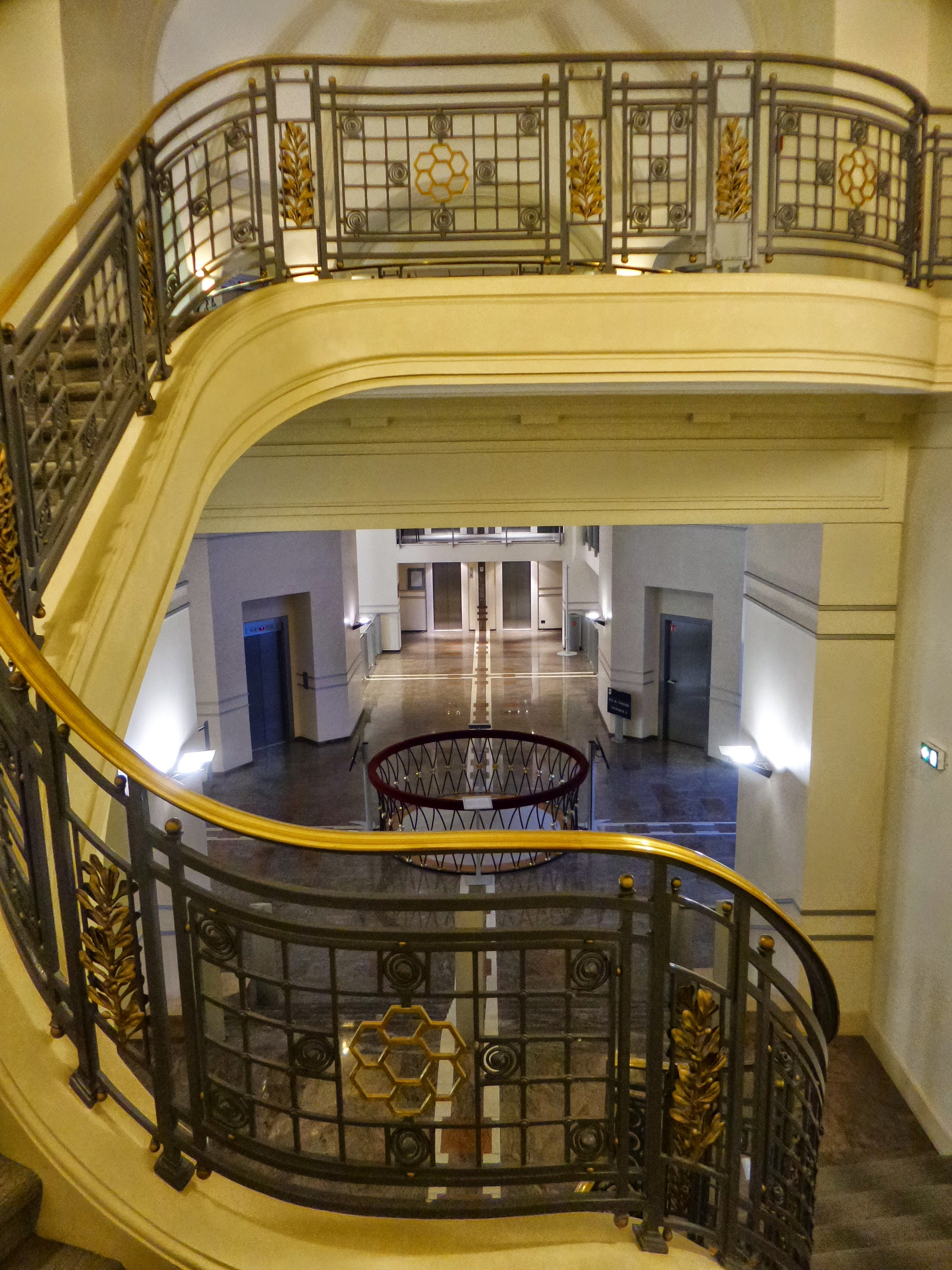
The staircase of the SCBP head office at 39-41, rue Cambon in Paris, photographed while in later use by Euronext in 2014

The Société Centrale des Banques de Province (SCBP, lit. 'Central Company of Provincial Banks'), known before 1908 as the Société Centrale du Syndicat des Banques de Province, was a bank in France, headquartered in Paris. It represented a unique attempt to bring together local ("provincial") banks into a national network, but ultimately failed in 1934.

== History ==
The origins of the SCBP go back to the formation of two trade bodies of French local banks, the Syndicat des banquiers des départements (lit. 'syndicate of the bankers from departments', est. 1885) and the Syndicat des banques de province (lit. 'syndicate of provincial banks', est. 1899). In 1904–1905, the latter body absorbed the former and created the SCBP as a central financial institution to offer wholesale services to its member banks. The network prospered somewhat in the aftermath of World War I but remained complex and fragile, and eventually collapsed in the wake of the European banking crisis of 1931.

From the 1910s it had its head office at 39–41, rue Cambon in central Paris, in a building erected in 1912 on a design by prominent Parisian architect Richard Bouwens van der Boijen.

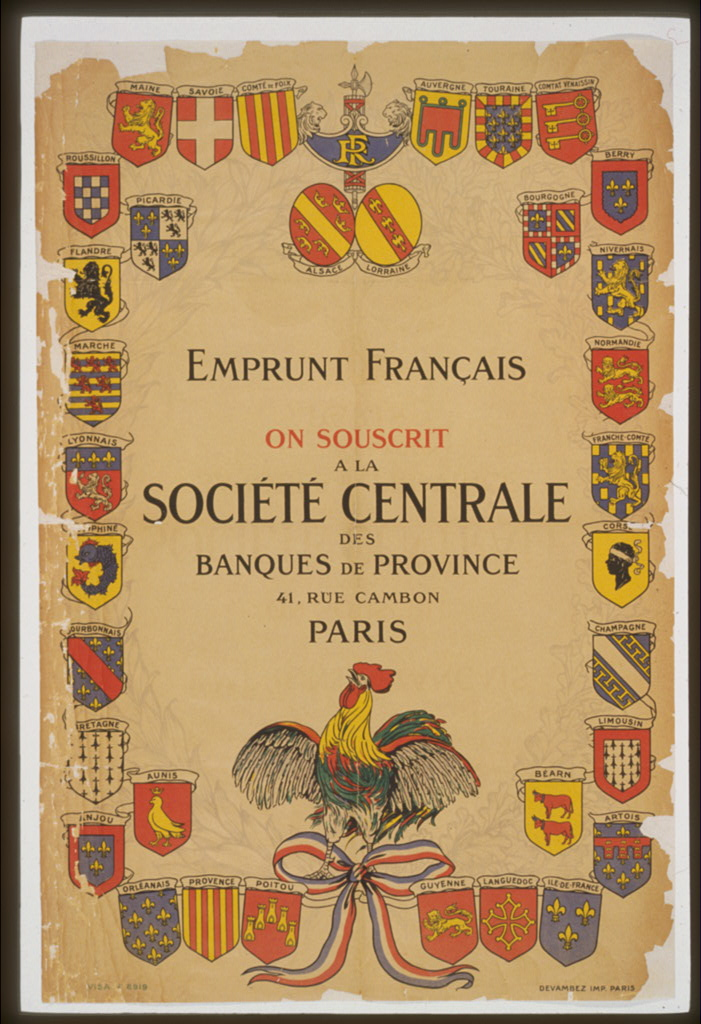
War bond advertisement poster of the SCBP, 1916, displaying the arms of the French historical regions ("provinces") where the network's member banks were established

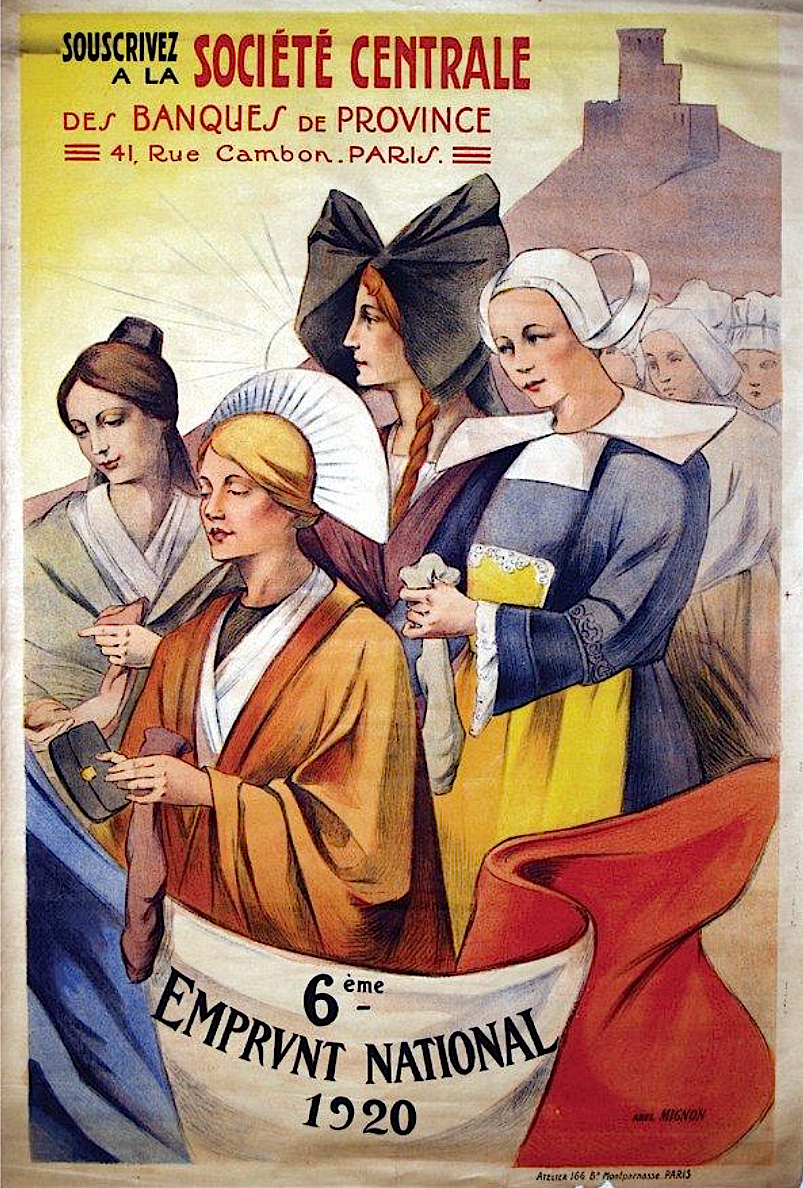
Reconstruction bond advertisement poster of the SCBP, 1920, displaying women in traditional garb from various French regions including Alsace and Bretagne

== See also ==
- Charles Dumont (politician)
- List of banks in France
