= Loretta Lux =

German fine art photographer

- Born: 1969 (age 56–57); Dresden, East Germany
- Education: Academy of Visual Arts
- Known for: Photography
- Awards: 2005 Infinity Award for Art, International Center of Photography, New York, NY

Loretta Lux (born 1969) is a fine art photographer known for her surreal portraits of young children. She lives and works in Ireland.

== Life and work ==
Lux was born in Dresden, East Germany. She graduated from the Academy of Visual Arts in Munich in the 1990s, and debuted at the Yossi Milo gallery, New York City in 2004.

Lux executes her compositions using a combination of photography, painting and digital manipulation. Her work usually features young children. She trained as a painter at Munich Academy of Art, and is influenced by painters such as Agnolo Bronzino, Diego Velázquez, Phillip Otto Runge.

The artist calls her own works "imaginary portraits, dealing with the idea of childhood"

Her portraits are not portraits in the conventional sense, but rather constructed ones. "I make the person my own. A portrait allows the artist, as well as the viewer, the chance to mirror themselves in the other and to reflect on their own existence." she has explained.

Lux often uses vast landscapes and empty spaces as backdrops in her staged photographs in order to depict alienation. "I believe man is alienated from the world. Industrialization and destruction of the natural environment have made it impossible for man to feel at home in the world." she stated in an interview. and "I think we are all rather lost, lost in a world we cannot understand."

In a review in The New York Times, Roberta Smith calls her works „some of the weirdest, most subtly manipulated pictures of our over-digitalized moment.“ Other critics have described her portraits as "as charming as they are creepy" (The Village Voice) and noted that the children "have the air of self-created beings, a race of tiny Nordic monsters" (New York Times).

In her essay, Francine Prose suggests that seeds of her East German upbringing are found in Lux's photographs. "... during Lux's childhood, the state channeled reality through the upbeat fantasy of Socialist realism. This was a society in which the cult of secrecy and surveillance was a daily reality.

== Awards ==
- 2005: Infinity Award for Art from the International Center of Photography.

== Collections ( Selection ) ==
Works by Loretta Lux are housed in the following public collections:

- Museum of Modern Art
- Solomon R. Guggenheim Museum, New York.
- Museum of Contemporary Art, Los Angeles.
- Art Institute of Chicago.
- Art Gallery of New South Wales, Sydney.
- National Gallery of Victoria
- Museum of Fine Arts, Houston
- J. Paul Getty Museum, Los Angeles
- Brooklyn Museum of Art
- San Francisco Museum of Modern Art
- Museum of Contemporary Photography, Chicago
- Los Angeles County Museum of Art
- Fotomuseum Winterthur
- National Museum of Art, Osaka
- Museo Nacional Centro de Arte Reina Sofia

== Reviews and Portfolios ==
- frieze/article/loretta-lux ( Frieze)
- loretta-lux-photographer-a-disturbing-childhood/ ( elsewhere.nz )
- milkbooks/loretta-lux/ Excerpts from Masterphotographers and their Art
- art-in-review-loretta-lux ( New York Times )
- Loretta Lux in Time Magazine ( Time Magazine )
- The Guardian "Loretta Lux`best shot" ( The Guardian)
- Telegraph loretta-Lux ( The Telegraph)

== See also ==
- List of German women artists
