= Hocquenghem =

Hocquenghem is a surname. Notable people with the surname include:

- Alexis Hocquenghem (1908–1990), French mathematician
- Guy Hocquenghem, French writer and philosopher
