= Lycée Henri-IV =

Coordinates: 48°50′45″N 2°20′52″E

- 23 Rue Clovis; 75005 Paris; France

Information
- Type: Public
- Motto: Domus Omnibus Una (A home for all)
- Established: 1796
- School district: Latin Quarter
- Principal: Stéphanie Motta-Garcia (proviseur)
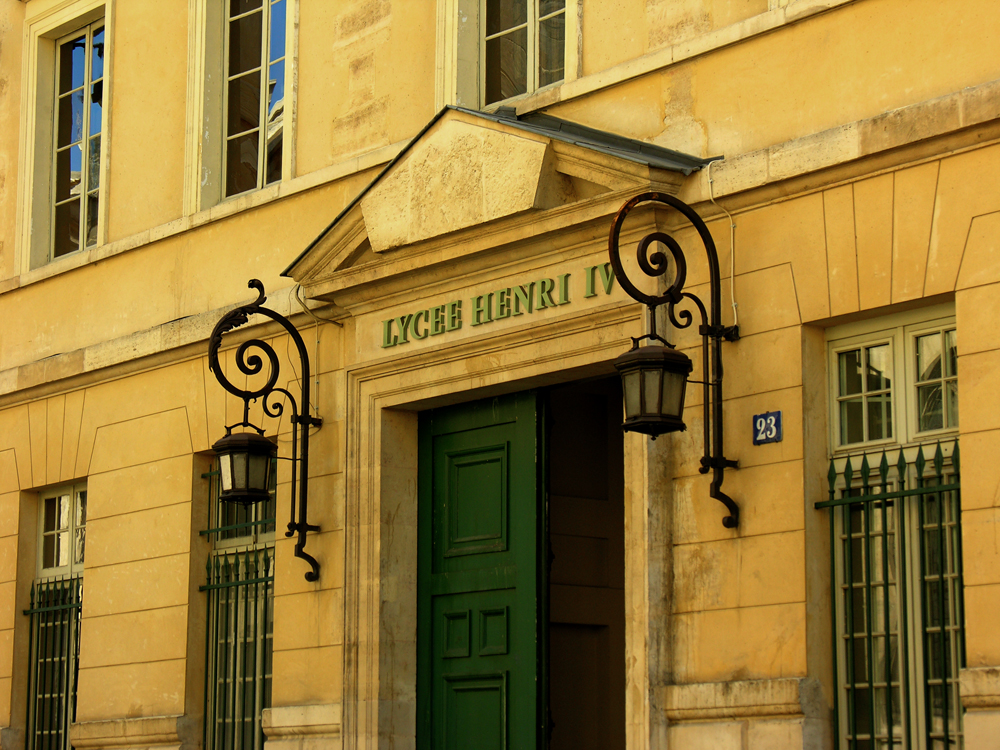

The Lycée Henri-IV (French pronunciation: [lise ɑ̃ʁi katʁ]) is a public secondary school located in Paris. Along with the Lycée Louis-le-Grand, it is a sixth-form college (lycée) in France.

The school educates around 2,700 students from collège (the first four years of secondary education in France) to classes préparatoires (preparatory classes to prepare students for entry to the elite grandes écoles such as École normale supérieure, École polytechnique, Centrale Paris, Mines ParisTech, ISAE-SUPAERO, HEC Paris, ESSEC Business School, and ESCP Europe, among others).

Its motto is "Domus Omnibus Una" ("A Home For All").

== Buildings and history ==
Lycée Henri-IV is located in the former royal Abbey of St Genevieve, in the heart of the Latin Quarter on the left bank of the river Seine, near the Panthéon, the church Saint-Étienne-du-Mont, and the rue Mouffetard. Rich in history, architecture and culture, the Latin Quarter contains France's oldest and the most prestigious educational establishments: the École Normale Supérieure, the Sorbonne, the Collège de France, the Lycée Saint-Louis and the Lycée Louis-le-Grand.

The abbey was first established in 506; it flourished as a consequence of royal patronage, becoming an integral part of the Sorbonne and housing a great library. The abbey was suppressed during the French Revolution, and in October 1796 the site became the first of many public schools in France. The lycée's name has changed several times since its inception–École Centrale du Panthéon (1794–1804); Lycée Napoléon (1804–1815); Collège Henri IV (1815–1848); Lycée Napoléon (1848–1870) and Lycée Corneille (1870–1872)–before its current name was settled on in 1873.

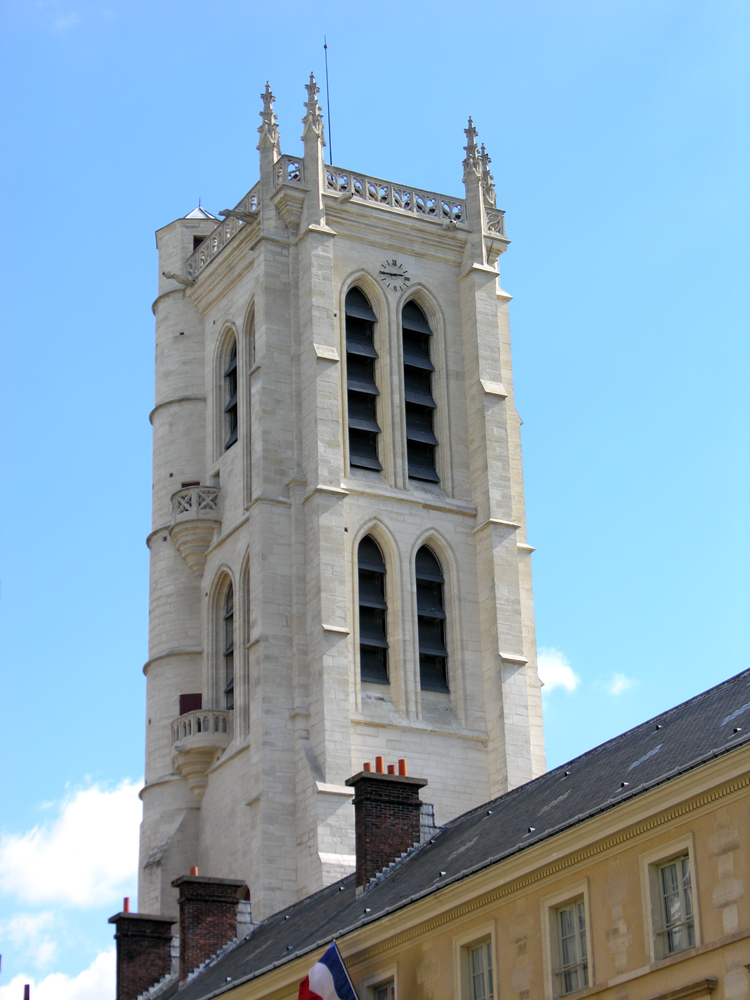
Lycée Henri-IV: Clovis bell tower

Today Henri-IV retains many features of the former abbey. The former abbey's library, which had the third-largest collection of books in Europe (transferred to the nearby Bibliothèque Sainte-Geneviève during the 19th century), is composed of four aisles forming a cross with a cupola in the intersection. It is one of the main features of the Lycée with its 18th-century boiseries and pavement as well as a cupola frescoed and carved by the painter Jean Restout the Younger in the 1730s. Two aisles of the library are now used as libraries for Lycée and Classes Préparatoires levels and the two other aisles are used as rooms for conferences and exams. Another highlight is the Salle des médailles (Room of the medals), a long gallery once used as a cabinet of curiosities (a room used to display natural curiosities and artworks). It has richly decorated and carved baroque boiseries and mirrors dating back to the 18th century. The lycée's chapel dates back to the Middle Ages as does the cloister and the Clovis tower, perhaps the lycée's most famous feature. The Salle des Actes displays medieval effigies of the abbey's monks, discovered during restoration in the 1990s. The main staircase, named the escalier de la Vierge (Virgin Mary's staircase), which has a 17th-century statue of the Virgin Mary as its centrepiece, is another striking feature.

== Notable alumni ==
- Eugène Albertini, epigrapher
- Dov Alfon, journalist, writer, editor-in-chief and head of editorial strategy of the French newspaper Libération
- Serge Audier, award-winning political philosopher in France
- Victor Baltard, architect
- Delphine Batho, politician
- Jean Baudrillard, sociologist
- Guy Béart, singer
- Ferdinand de Lesseps, Diplomat and entrepreneur responsible for the Suez Canal
- Marcellin Berthelot, chemist
- Léon Blum, French prime minister (during the Popular Front government)
- Jean-Louis Bory, novelist and film critic
- Patrick Boucheron, historian
- Jacques de Bourbon Busset, co-founder of CERN, member of the Académie française
- Patrick Bruel, French singer-writer (who refers to the lycée in his song "Place des grands hommes")
- Isambard Kingdom Brunel, British engineer
- René Capitant, lawyer and politician
- Augustin-Louis Cauchy, mathematician, engineer, and physicist
- Camille Dalmais, singer
- Gilles Deleuze, philosopher
- Claire Dorland-Clauzel, Michelin's head of communications
- Arthur Dreyfus, journalist and writer
- Esther Duflo, economist, professor at the MIT, recipient of the John Bates Clark Medal in 2010, Nobel Memorial Prize in Economic Sciences, 2019.
- Léon-Paul Fargue, poet
- Valentin Feldman, philosopher and member of the French resistance
- Michel Foucault, philosopher
- Paul Fournel, writer and bicyclist
- Georges Friedmann, sociologist
- André Gide, writer, Nobel Prize in Literature 1947.
- Julien Gracq, writer
- Georges-Eugène Haussmann, baron, préfet, and city planner
- Stella Jang, Korean singer-songwriter
- Alfred Jarry, writer, best known for Ubu Roi
- Emmanuel Le Roy Ladurie, historian, best known for Montaillou
- Claude Lefort, philosopher and political activist
- Pierre Loti, sailor and writer
- Emmanuel Macron, French President
- Jacques Maritain, philosopher
- Carlo Marochetti, sculptor
- Jean Malaurie, anthropologist, biologist and writer
- Guy de Maupassant, writer
- Prosper Mérimée, writer (of Carmen, for example)
- Christopher Meyer, British ambassador to the United States
- Marius Moutet, diplomat
- Alfred de Musset, playwright and poet
- Paul Nizan, philosopher and writer
- Henri d'Orléans, Count of Paris, pretender to the French throne
- Jean d'Ormesson, novelist, fellow of the Académie française
- Mazarine Pingeot, novelist and journalist, daughter of French president François Mitterrand
- Plantu, cartoonist for Le Monde
- Henri Pourrat, writer and anthropologist
- Pierre Puvis de Chavannes, painter
- Didier Ratsiraka, former President of Madagascar
- Pierre Restany, art critic and cultural philosopher
- Éric Rohmer, New Wave director, writer and actor
- Michel Sapin, Deputy Minister of Justice from May 1991 to April 1992, Finance Minister from April 1992 to March 1993, and Minister of Civil Servants and State Reforms from March 2000 to May 2002. Current Finance Minister.
- Jean-Paul Sartre, philosopher, Nobel Prize in Literature 1964.
- Georges Saupique, sculptor and creator of the school's war memorial
- Maurice Schumann, fellow of the Académie française, minister, and senator
- Jorge Semprún, Spanish Minister for culture
- Antoine Song, mathematician
- Bertrand Tavernier, actor, director, producer
- Albert Thibaudet, essayist and critic
- Fabrice Tourre, Goldman Sachs trader
- Pierre Uri, economist and public servant
- Pierre Vidal-Naquet, historian
- Alfred de Vigny, poet
- André Vingt-Trois, Cardinal, former Archbishop of Paris
- Simone Weil, philosopher
- Laurent Wauquiez, former French Minister of Higher Education and Research
- Jean Yoyotte, Egyptologist
- Gabriel Zucman, economist, recipient of the John Bates Clark Medal in 2010

== Notable teachers ==
- Henri Bergson, philosopher
- Étienne Borne, philosopher
- Jean-Louis Bory, novelist and film critic
- Émile Auguste Chartier, philosopher
- Georges Cuvier, naturalist and zoologist
- Georges Pompidou, French president

== See also ==
- Secondary education in France
- Education in France

== Notes and references ==
Notes

Sources

- Robin, Françoise (2011). "Le Lycée sur la Montagne/Histoire" [The Lycée on the Mountain/History] (in French). Paris: Lycée Henri-IV.

== Bibliography ==
- Sophie Peltier-Le Dinh, Danielle Michel-Chich & André Arnold-Peltier, Le Lycée Henri-IV, entre potaches et moines copistes, PIPPA; ISBN 978-2-916506-16-6
